= Seventh interval =

In music and in music theory, "seventh interval" refers to the following musical intervals:

- major seventh,
- minor seventh,
- augmented seventh, or
- diminished seventh.

It also refers to inverted second intervals.
