= Tenth (interval) =

Musical compound interval

In music theory, a tenth (or compound third) is a musical interval encompassing ten scale degrees. It is a compound interval, composed of an octave plus a third. Like a third, a tenth is typically major or minor but can also have other chord qualities, like being augmented or diminished.

== Major tenth ==
Major tenth
Name
- Other names: Compound major third
- Abbreviation: M10

Size
- Semitones: 16
- Interval class: 4

Cents
- Equal temperament: 1600

A major tenth is a compound interval spanning 16 semitones, or 4 semitones above an octave. For example, the interval between C_{4} and E_{5} (in scientific pitch notation) is a major tenth.

== Minor tenth ==
Minor tenth
Name
- Other names: Compound minor third
- Abbreviation: m10

Size
- Semitones: 15
- Interval class: 3

Cents
- Equal temperament: 1500

A minor tenth is a compound interval spanning 15 semitones, or 3 semitones above an octave. For example, the interval between C_{4} and E♭_{5} is a minor tenth.
