= Diminished sixth =

- Inverse: augmented third

Name
- Other names: -
- Abbreviation: d6

Size
- Semitones: 7
- Interval class: 5
- Just interval: 192:125, 32:21,49:32

Cents
- 12-Tone equal temperament: 700
- 24-Tone equal temperament: 700
- Just intonation: 743

In classical music from Western culture, a diminished sixth is an interval produced by narrowing a minor sixth by a chromatic semitone. For example, the interval from A to F is a minor sixth, eight semitones wide, and both the intervals from A♯ to F, and from A to F♭ are diminished sixths, spanning seven semitones.

Being diminished, it is considered a dissonant interval, despite being equivalent to an interval known for its consonance. Its inversion is the augmented third, and its enharmonic equivalent is the perfect fifth.

== "Wolf fifth" ==
A severely dissonant diminished sixth is observed when a fixed-pitch instrument limited to twelve notes per octave is tuned using Pythagorean tuning or a meantone temperament with a fifth flatter than 700 cents. Typically, this is the interval between G♯ and E♭. Since this interval was considered to "howl like a wolf" (because of the beating), and since it sounded like a badly out-of-tune fifth, this interval is called the "wolf" fifth. A justly tuned fifth is the most consonant interval after the perfect unison and the perfect octave.
