= Diminished octave =

diminished octave
- Inverse: Augmented unison

Name
- Other names: Diminished eighth
- Abbreviation: d8

Size
- Semitones: 11
- Interval class: 1
- Just interval: 48:25, 49:26 (13-limit), 256:135, 4096:2187

Cents
- 12-Tone equal temperament: 1100
- Just intonation: 1129, 1108, 1086

In music from Western culture, a diminished octave is an interval produced by narrowing a perfect octave by a chromatic semitone. As such, the two notes are denoted by the same letter but have different accidentals. For instance, the interval from C_{4} to C_{5} is a perfect octave, twelve semitones wide, and both the intervals from C♯_{4} to C_{5} and from C_{4} to C♭_{5} are diminished octaves, spanning eleven semitones.

Being diminished, it is considered a dissonant interval. The diminished octave is enharmonically equivalent to the major seventh.
