= Quarte =

Quarte can refer to:

- A type of parry in fencing; see Parry_(fencing)#Classification
- In music, the interval of a fourth; see Perfect fourth, Augmented fourth, and Diminished fourth
