= Diminished fourth =

diminished fourth
- Inverse: augmented fifth

Name
- Other names: -
- Abbreviation: d4

Size
- Semitones: 4
- Interval class: 4
- Just interval: 32:25, 8192:6561, 14:11

Cents
- 12-Tone equal temperament: 400
- Just intonation: 427, 384, 417.5

In classical music from Western culture, a diminished fourth is an interval produced by narrowing a perfect fourth by a chromatic semitone. For example, the interval from C to F is a perfect fourth, five semitones wide, and both the intervals from C♯ to F, and from C to F♭ are diminished fourths, spanning four semitones.

Being diminished, it is considered a dissonant interval. A diminished fourth is enharmonically equivalent to a major third; that is, it spans the same number of semitones, and they are physically the same pitch in twelve-tone equal temperament. For example, B–D♯ is a major third; but if the same pitches are spelled B and E♭, as occurs in the C harmonic minor scale, the interval is instead a diminished fourth. In other tunings, however, they are not necessarily identical. For example, in 31 equal temperament the diminished fourth is slightly wider than a major third, and is instead the same width as the septimal major third. The Pythagorean diminished fourth (F♭, 8192:6561 = 384.36 cents), also known as the schismatic major third, is closer to the just major third than the Pythagorean major third.

In just intonation the usual diminished fourth: the interval C♯ to F, a diatonic minor second plus a pure minor third, or the interval C to F♭, a minor third plus a diatonic minor second, is 16/15 * 6/5 = 32/25.

The 32:25 just diminished fourth arises in the C harmonic minor scale between B and E♭.

== See also ==
- Schismatic temperament
