= Augmented triad =

Musical chord

augmented triad
Component intervals from root
- augmented fifth
- major third
- root

Tuning
- 16:20:25

Forte no. / Complement
- 3-12 / 9-12

An augmented triad is a chord with a major third and an augmented fifth above the root. It is equivalent to a major chord whose top note (fifth) is augmented (raised by a chromatic semitone). When using popular-music symbols, it is indicated by the symbol "+" or "aug". For example, the augmented triad built on A♭, written as A♭+, has pitches A♭-C-E:

The chord can be represented by the integer notation {0, 4, 8}.

== Analysis ==
Whereas a major triad, such as C–E–G, contains a major third (C–E) and a minor third (E–G), with the interval of the fifth (C–G) being perfect, the augmented triad has an augmented fifth, becoming C–E–G♯. In other words, the top note is raised a semitone. H.R. Palmer notes:

The augmented chord, (which appears upon three of the minor key,) is commonly found upon one, four, or five of a major key. In its resolution the fundamental may either remain stationary, descend five degrees, or ascend four degrees; the third may either ascend a minor second [I+, IV and I+, IV^{6}_{4}], or remain stationary [I+, vi^{6}_{3}]; and the fifth ascends a minor second. The inversions of the augmented chord may also be used [I+^{♯6}, IV and I+^{6}_{4}, IV^{6}].

The augmented chord on I may contain the major seventh (I^{7}_{5} or I^{6}_{5}), while the augmented chord on V may contain the minor seventh (V^{7}_{5}, V^{6}_{5}, or V^{4}_{3}). In C: C–E–G♯–B and G–B–D♯–F.

The augmented triad on the V may be used as a substitute dominant, and may also be considered as ♭III+. The example below shows ♭III+ as a substitute dominant in a ii-V-I turnaround in C major.

See, for example, Henry Purcell's Dido & Aeneas.

Purcell from Dido & Aeneas, Act 2, scene 1, echo chorus

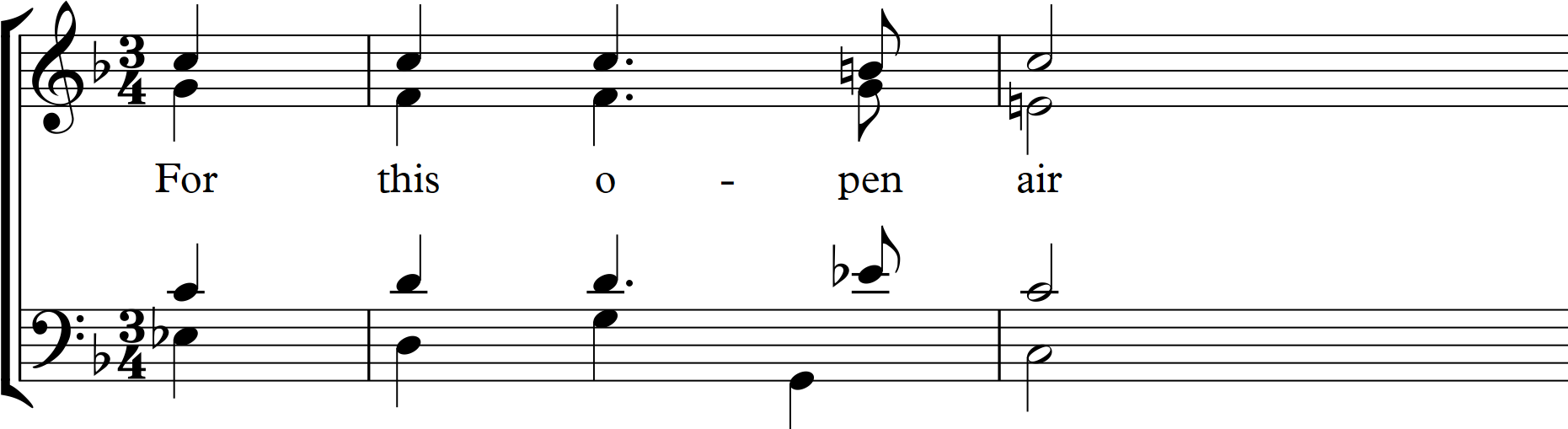
Purcell from Dido & Aeneas, Act 2, scene 1, echo chorus

== In popular music ==
Examples of popular music songs featuring the augmented chord include its use in the introduction of Chuck Berry's "School Days", Aaron Neville's "Tell It Like It Is", The Beatles' "Oh! Darling", after intros in Gene Pitney's "Town Without Pity", The Beach Boys' "The Warmth of the Sun", Joe Cocker's "Delta Lady", at the end of the bridge in Patience and Prudence's "Tonight You Belong to Me", The Caravelles' "You Don't Have to Be a Baby to Cry", The Beatles' "From Me to You", The Dave Clark Five's "Glad All Over", and Martha and the Vandellas' "Dancing in the Street". One of the few examples of an augmented chord on the opening downbeat is in the Carmen Lombardo song "Seems Like Old Times": in Barber Shop Memories, Book 2 the 4-part vocal score for the song (in the key of F) uses B♭–D–F♯ to harmonize the downbeat as IV+ (the enharmonic equivalent of VI+). An augmented chord also harmonizes the opening downbeat of the chorus of the 1908 song "Shine On, Harvest Moon", heard at the beginning of the 1931 recording by Ruth Etting.

Augmented chords from chromatic passing motion, ascending ("(Just Like) Starting Over") and descending ("All My Loving").

Other examples of the augmented chord include its use as a chromatic passing function over the first degree, the rising to ♯ then harmonized as IV, as in Jay and the Americans' "Some Enchanted Evening", Lesley Gore's "It's My Party" (I – I+ – IV – iv) (see also minor major seventh chord), Herman's Hermits' "There's a Kind of Hush" (continues to ♭7 harmonized by Im^{7}), by ii Roy Orbison's "Crying", followed by 6 – ♭6 – 5 motion in "Crying", The Guess Who's "Laughing", Dave Clark Five's "Because" (verse: I – I+ – vi – Im^{7}... ii and cadence on V+), The Monkees' "Tapioca Tundra" (I – I+ – vi, and V+ after bridge).

Though rare, the augmented chord occurs in rock music "almost always as a linear embellishment linking an opening tonic chord with the next chord", for example John Lennon's "(Just Like) Starting Over" and The Beatles' "All My Loving". Thus, with an opening tonic chord, an augmented chord results from ascending or descending movement between the fifth and sixth degrees, such as in the chord progression I – I+ – vi. This progression forms the verse for Oasis's 2005 single "Let There Be Love" (I – I+ – vi – IV)

== In classical music ==
The augmented triad differs from the other kinds of triad (the major triad, the minor triad, and the diminished triad) in that it does not naturally arise in a diatonic scale. Although it could be conceptualized as a triad built on the third degree of a harmonic minor scale or melodic minor scale, it virtually never occurs in this way due to the harsh dissonance of the chord.

Striking examples of its use may be found in Mozart’s keyboard minuet K355. It first occurs as a passing chord on the third beat of bar 1 (D♯–G–B). However it comes into more striking prominence in the 6-bar sequential passage starting on the first beat of bar 5 (D-F♯–A♯):

Mozart, Minuet, K355

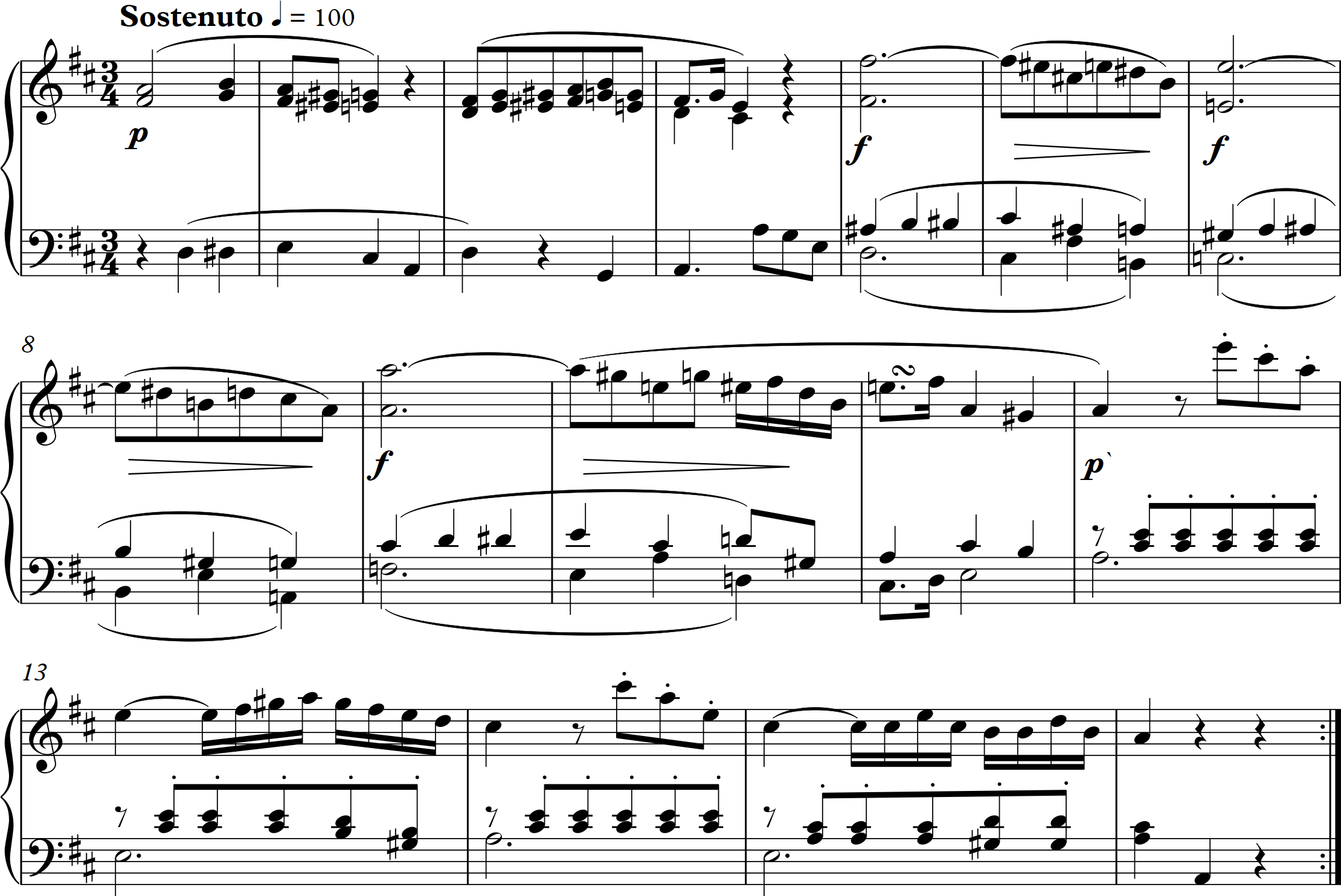
Mozart, Minuet, K355

According to Aubyn Raymar, in this minuet “flowing counterpoints woven among closely crowded chromaticisms and richly variegated harmony, sequential progressions in either direction coupled with unexpected dissonance… - such resources used with a mastery of concentration intensify the emotion which stirs within the brooding phrases of a perfectly balanced poem.”

Its rarity makes the augmented triad a special chord that touches on the atonal. Its uses to 'suspend' tonality are famous; for example, in Arnold Schoenberg's "Walzer" (Fünf Klavierstücke Op. 23 No. 5). An earlier example may be found at the opening of Franz Liszt's Faust Symphony, where a sequence of augmented triads unfolds as arpeggios:

Liszt 'Faust' Symphony, opening

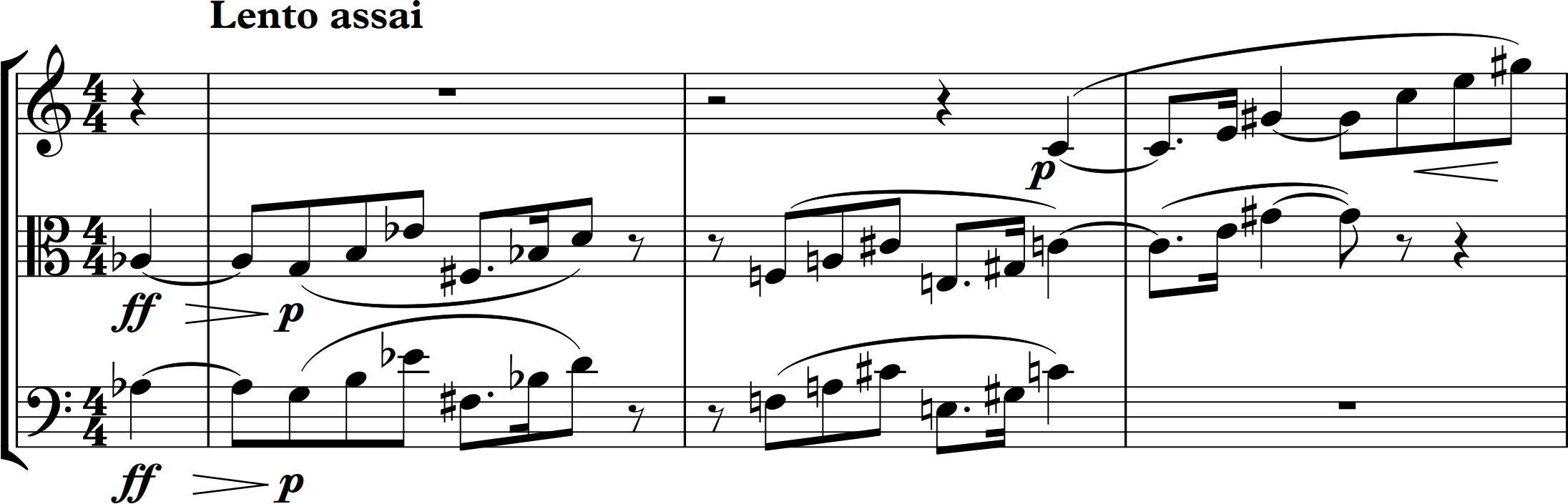
Liszt 'Faust' Symphony, opening

However, the augmented triad occurs in tonal music, with a perfectly tonal meaning, since at least J.S. Bach. See the "surprising" first chord (D–F♯–B♭) in the opening chorus to his cantata Ach Gott, vom Himmel sieh darein, BWV 2:

Bach Cantata BWV 2 opening chorus

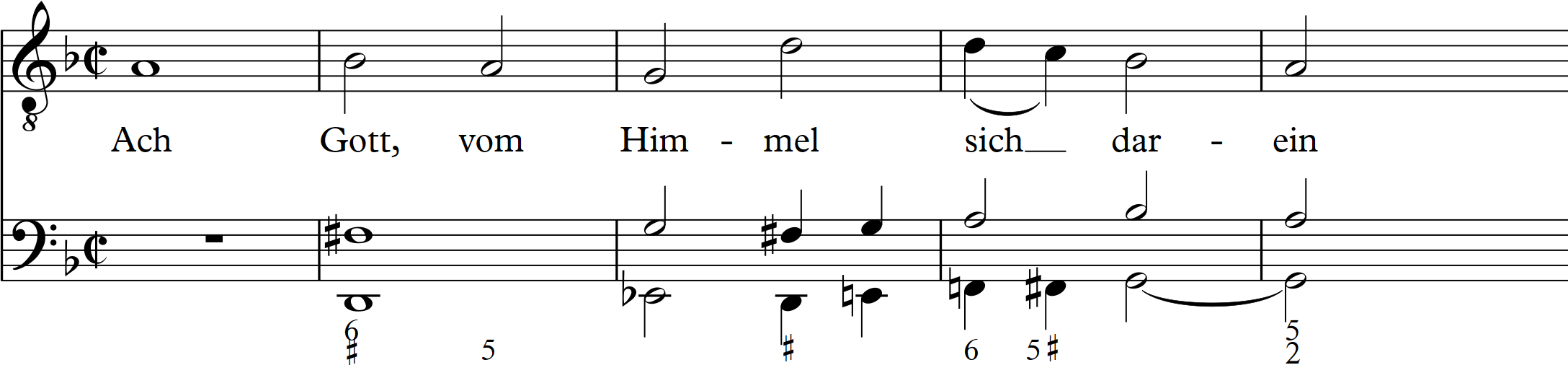
Bach Cantata BWV 2 opening chorus

. Other examples may be found in the work of Joseph Haydn. See, for example, bars 5-8 of the Trio from Haydn's String Quartet Op. 54 No. 2:

Haydn Quartet, Op. 54 No. 2, minuet, Trio section

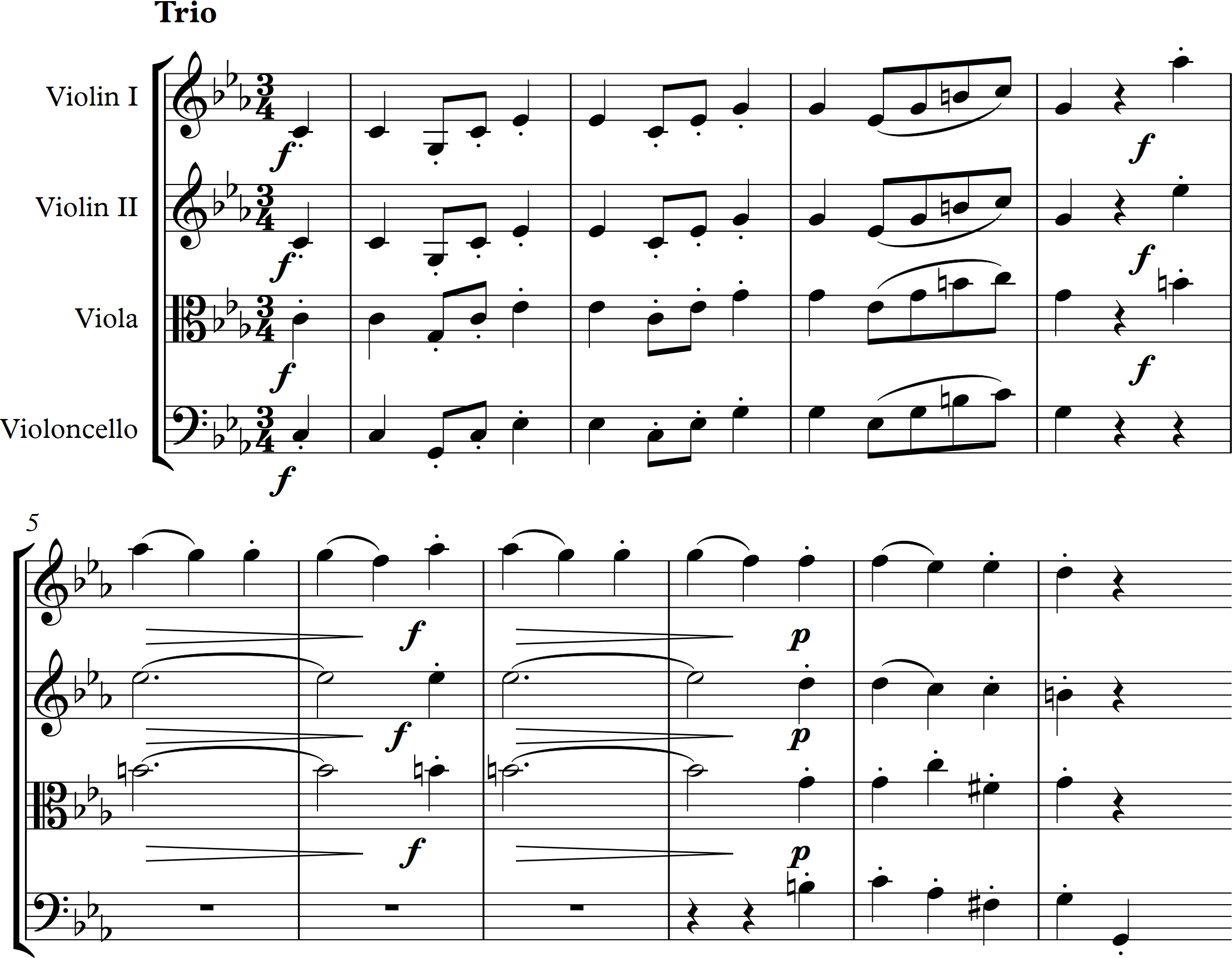
Haydn Quartet, Op. 54 No. 2, minuet, Trio section

-also in Richard Wagner's Siegfried Idyll:

Wagner Siegfried Idyll bars 148-153

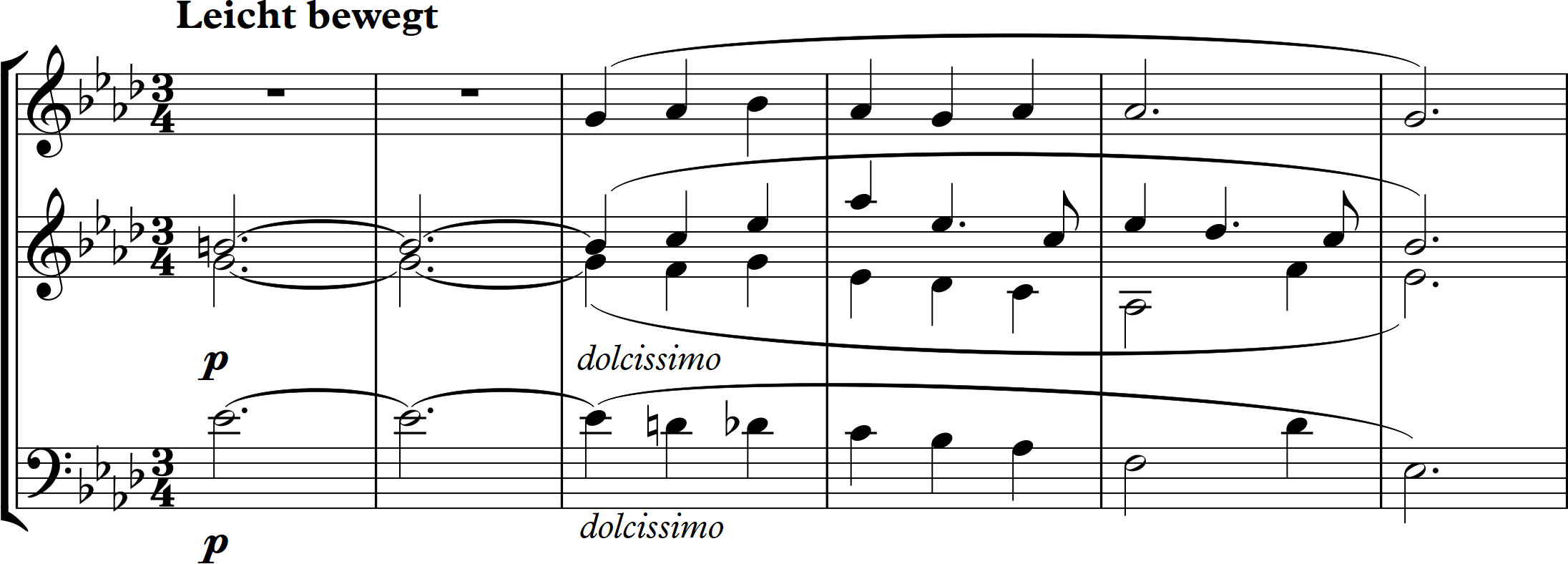
Wagner Siegfried Idyll bars 148-153

-and in Chopin’s stormy Prelude No. 24. The left hand piano arpeggios outline an augmented triad (D♭–F-A) in bars 47-50. The sudden change in dynamics from forte to a hushed piano in these bars highlights the emotional intensity of this passage:

Chopin Prelude No. 24, bars 43-51

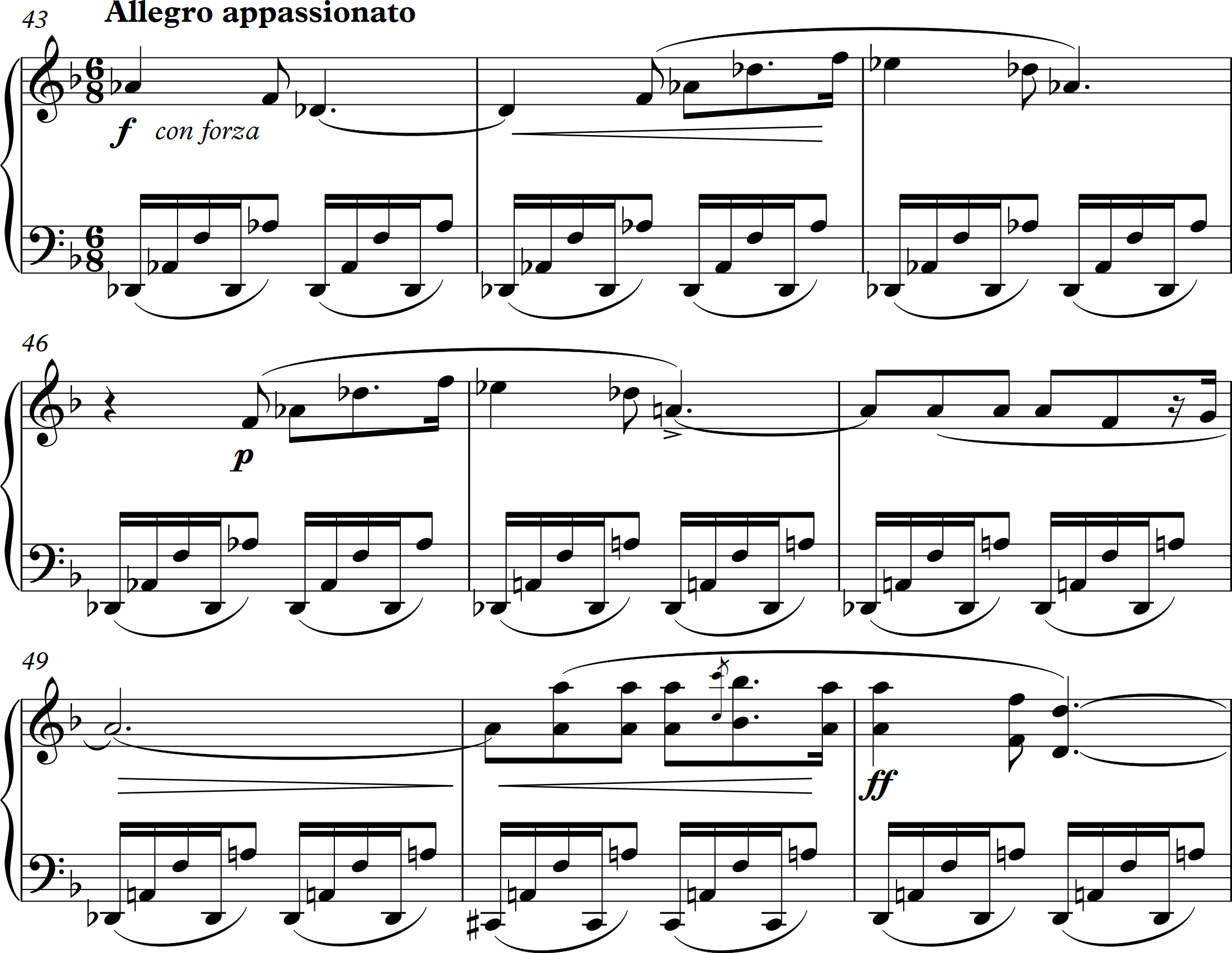
Chopin Prelude No. 24, bars 43-51

An augmented triad results diatonically in minor mode from a dominant chord where the fifth (the second degree) is replaced by the third degree, as an anticipation of the resolution chord. Johannes Brahms's Tragic Overture also features the chord prominently (A–C♯–E♯), in alternation with the regular dominant (A–C♯–E). In this example one can also see other aspect of the appeal of the chord to composers: it is a 'conflation' of the fifth degree and the third degree, the usual contrasting keys of a piece in the minor mode. The "whirl of the final bars" of Mahler’s Symphony No. 7 features an abrupt interpolation of an augmented chord (E–G♯–C) in the penultimate bar, before the final chord of C major:

Mahler Symphony No. 7 concluding bars

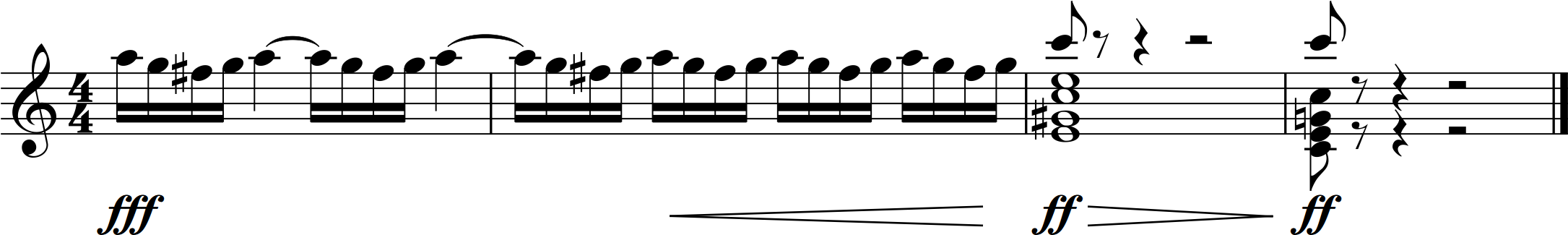
Mahler Symphony No. 7 concluding bars

With the lead of Franz Schubert (in his Wanderer Fantasy), Romantic composers started organizing many pieces by descending major thirds, which can be seen as a large-scale application of the augmented triad (although it probably arose from other lines of development not necessarily connected to the augmented triad). This kind of organization is common; in addition to Schubert, it is found in music of Franz Liszt, Nikolai Rimsky-Korsakov, Louis Vierne and Richard Wagner, among others.

== Expressive and dramatic potential ==
The striking sound of the augmented triad lends itself to effective word painting, especially when conveying strong emotion. The first song in Robert Schumann’s song cycle Frauen-Liebe und Leben uses the chord (F♯-B♭-D) on the second syllable of the word “empor” to convey the intensity of the singer’s feeling for her beloved:.

Schumann, Frauen-Liebe und Leben, No. 1, bars 12-17

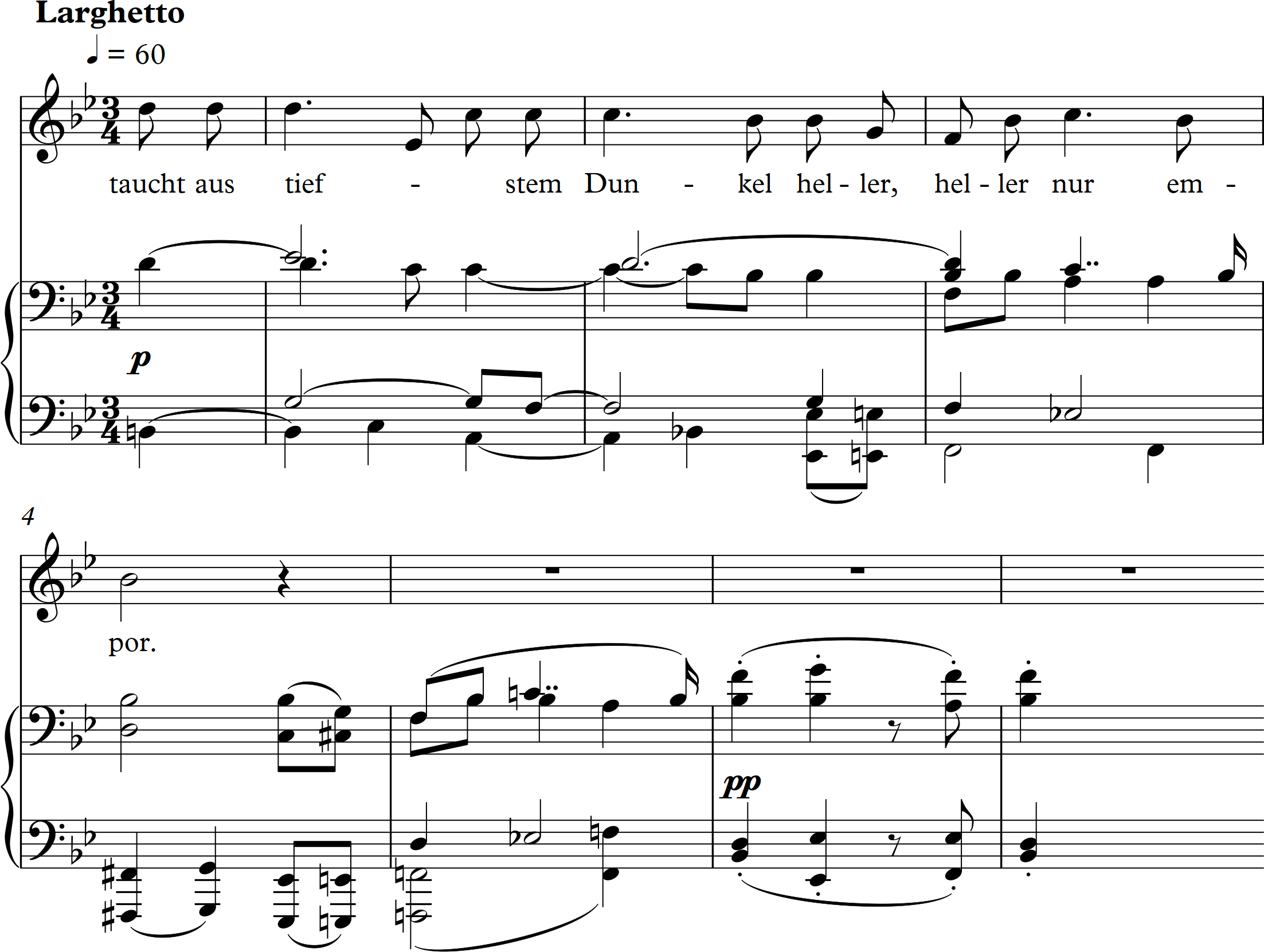
Schumann, Frauen-Liebe und Leben, No. 1

In Purcell’s opera Dido and Aeneas, on the other hand, the malign Sorceress planning Dido’s downfall sings the word “hate” to the accompaniment of an augmented chord (F–A–D♭) :

Dido & Aeneas from Act II, scene 1

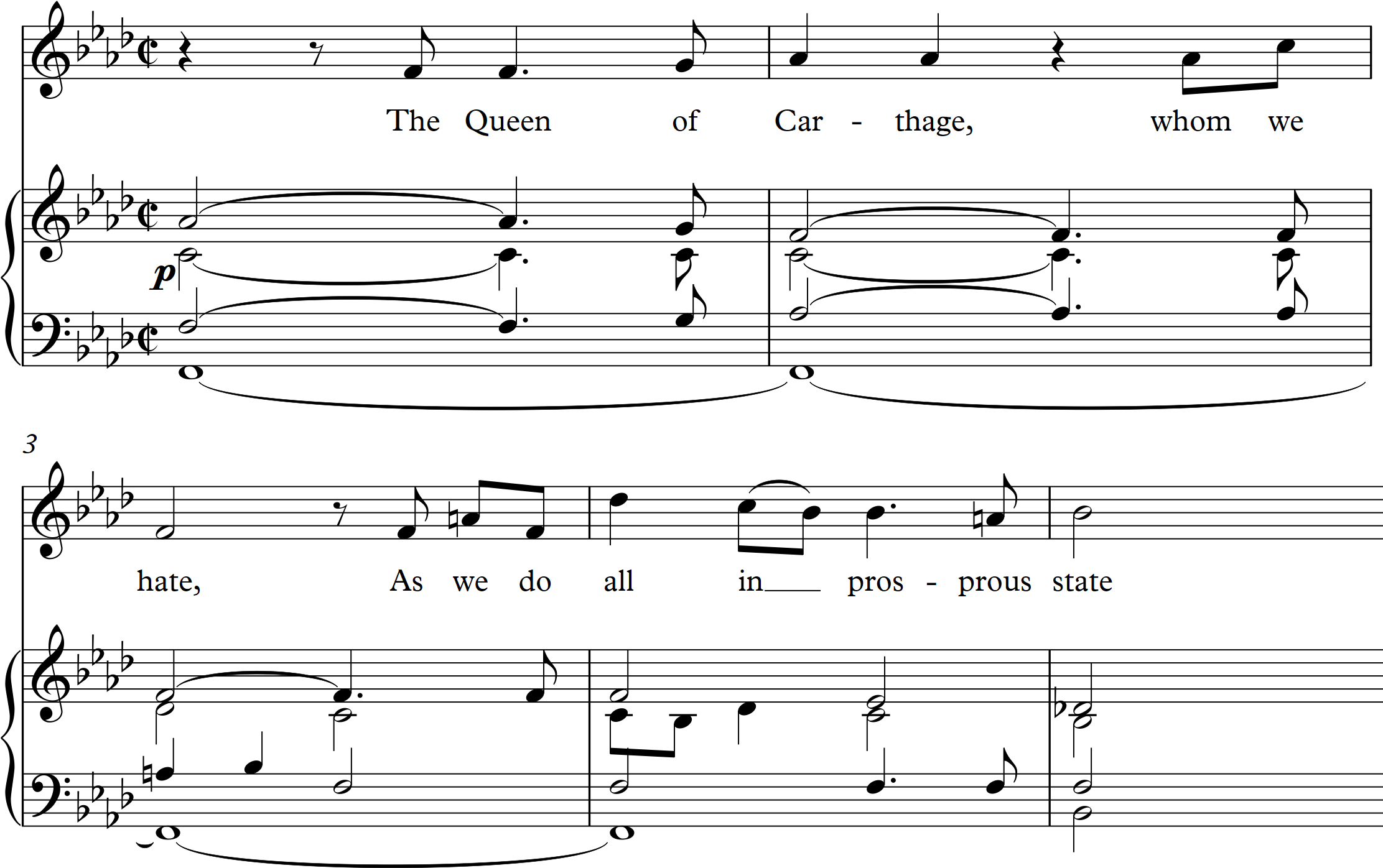
Dido & Aeneas from Act II, scene 1

In J.S. Bach’s Magnificat, the composer sets the words “dispersit superbos mente cordis sui” (He hath scattered the proud in the imagination of their hearts) with a powerful chord sequence starting with an augmented triad (F♯–A♯-D) on the word “mente.” The passage is made all the more effective by being inititated by a sudden tempo change and a beat’s silence. This gives the chord considerable dramatic clout:

Bach Magnificat, BWV 243, Fecit Potentiam, bars 20-32

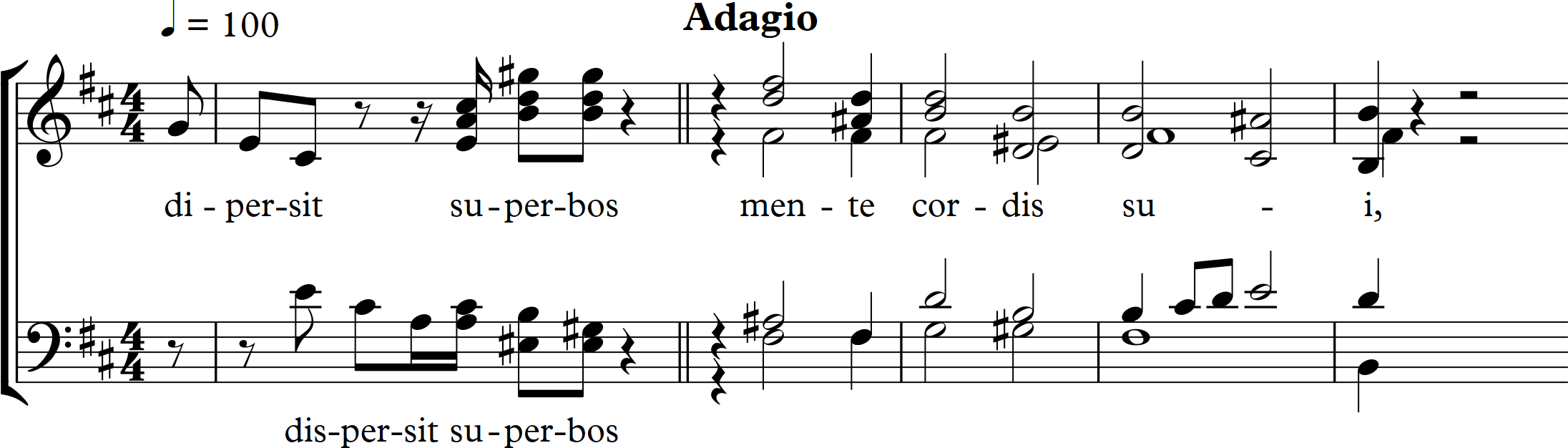
Bach Magnificat, BWV 243, Fecit Potentiam, bars 20-32

In the opening scene of Wagner’s Götterdämmerung, one of the three Norns conveys her dread and uncertainty about what is going to pass. “Sing, sister, wind the rope of fate.” The underlying orchestral accompaniment contains ominous augmented chords of “ambiguous tonality.”:

Wagner from Götterdämmerung - Norn's fateful prediction

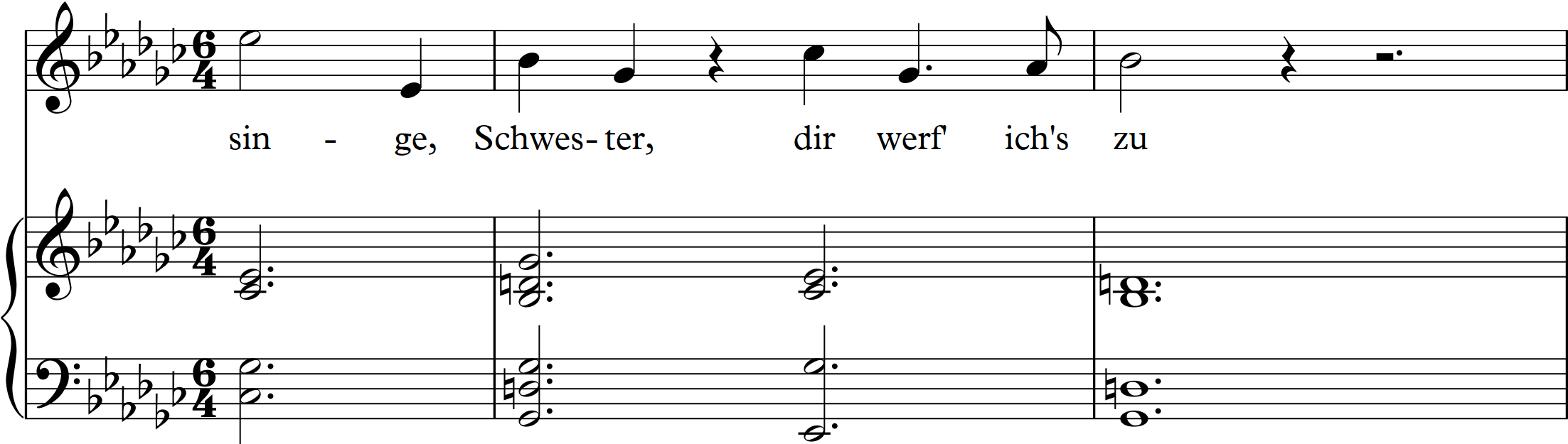
Wagner from Götterdämmerung - Norn's fateful prediction

== Tuning ==
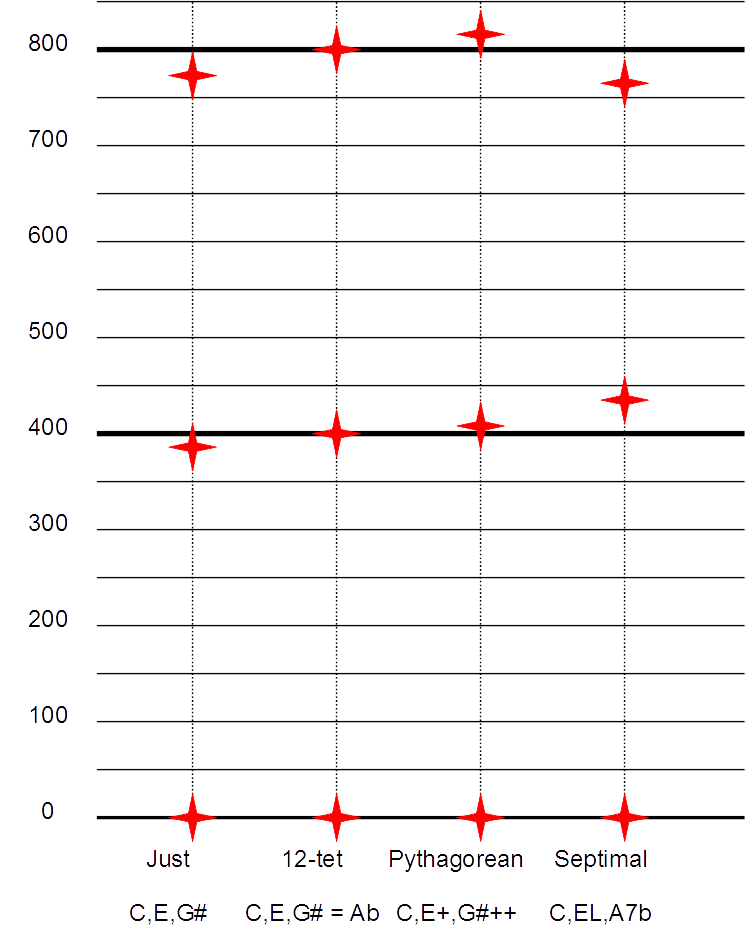
Comparison, in cents, of augmented triad tunings

In just intonation, the interval between two major thirds and an octave, 2:(5:4)^{2}, is 32:25, which is flatter by a septimal kleisma of size 225:224 than the septimal major third with ratio 9:7. While septimal meantone temperament tempers out the septimal kleisma, some other temperaments, for example miracle temperament, do so also, and in all of these temperaments the augmented triad may be identified with a circle of two major and one septimal major thirds, making up an octave.

== Augmented chord table ==
Chord	Root	Major third	Augmented fifth
C♭aug	C♭	E♭	G
Caug	C	E	G♯
C♯aug	C♯	E♯ (F)	G (A)
D♭aug	D♭	F	A
Daug	D	F♯	A♯
D♯aug	D♯	F (G)	A (B)
E♭aug	E♭	G	B
Eaug	E	G♯	B♯ (C)
E♯aug	E♯	G (A)	B (C♯)
F♭aug	F♭	A♭	C
Faug	F	A	C♯
F♯aug	F♯	A♯	C (D)
G♭aug	G♭	B♭	D
Gaug	G	B	D♯
G♯aug	G♯	B♯ (C)	D (E)
A♭aug	A♭	C	E
Aaug	A	C♯	E♯ (F)
A♯aug	A♯	C (D)	E (F♯)
B♭aug	B♭	D	F♯
Baug	B	D♯	F (G)
B♯aug	B♯	D (E)	F♯ (G♯)

== See also ==
- Altered chord
- Diminished triad
- Giant Steps (composition) and Coltrane changes
