= Color (medieval music) =

In medieval music theory, the terms color and coloration are used in four distinct senses, two of which relate to the notation and structuring of note durations, the third to florid ornamentation, and the fourth to the quality of chromatic music.

== Coloration (mensural notation device) ==
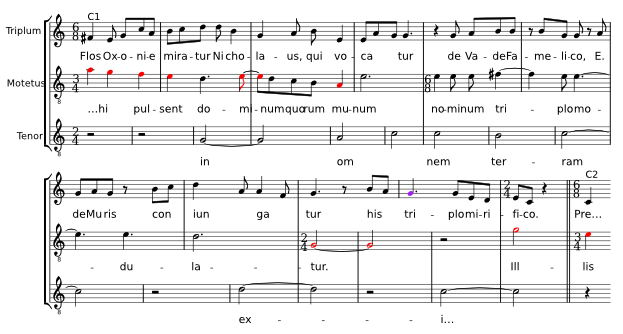
Example of late-14th century music using coloration for notating complex polymetric effects. Notes written in red in this modern transcription are also written in red in the original mensural notation. In each case, this indicates they are to be read as binary ("imperfect"), non-dotted notes; without coloration, they would have been read as ternary ("perfect", i.e. dotted).

As a notation device in mensural notation, the 14th–16th century system of notating musical meters and rhythms, coloration refers to the technique of marking notes as having a change in durational value—most commonly a reduction to two thirds of their normal value. It is indicated by literally coloring the note-heads in the written music differently than their normal appearance. In the 14th and early 15th century, colored notes were typically marked in red while normal notes were black; in the 16th century, the same effect was achieved by filling the note-heads in black while normal notes were hollow. Sequences of colored notes can be used to notate triplet rhythms or hemiola effects.

== Color (isorhythm) ==
In isorhythmic compositions, a composition technique characteristic of motets in the 14th and early 15th centuries, the term color refers to a sequence of repeated notes in the cantus firmus tenor of a composition. The color is typically divided into several taleae, sequences that have the same rhythmic sequence.

== Coloration (ornamentation) ==
In the 16th to the 18th centuries, coloration refers to florid ornamentation, written or improvised, also called diminution, as well as to passages of free ornamentation called coloratura in the 19th century.

== Color (chromaticism) ==
In the 14th and 15th centuries, used the word "color" to refer to the beauty of the chromatic genus, for the effects of musica ficta, and the division of the whole tone into unequal parts, by which such "imperfect" intervals are "colored".
