= Interval (music) =

Difference in pitch between two notes

Melodic and harmonic intervals

In music theory, an interval is a difference in pitch between two sounds. An interval may be described as horizontal, linear, or melodic if it refers to successively sounding tones, such as two adjacent pitches in a melody, and vertical or harmonic if it pertains to simultaneously sounding tones, such as in a chord.

In Western music, intervals are most commonly differencing between notes of a diatonic scale. Intervals between successive notes of a scale are also known as scale steps. The smallest of these intervals is a semitone. Intervals smaller than a semitone are called microtones. They can be formed using the notes of various kinds of non-diatonic scales. Some of the very smallest ones are called commas, and describe small discrepancies, observed in some tuning systems, between enharmonically equivalent notes such as C♯ and D♭. Intervals can be arbitrarily small, and even imperceptible to the human ear.

In physical terms, an interval is the ratio between two sonic frequencies. For example, any two notes an octave apart have a frequency ratio of 2:1. This means that successive increments of pitch by the same interval result in an exponential increase of frequency, even though the human ear perceives this as a linear increase in pitch. For this reason, intervals are often measured in cents, a unit derived from the logarithm of the frequency ratio.

In Western music theory, the most common naming scheme for intervals describes two properties of the interval: the quality (perfect, major, minor, augmented, diminished) and number (unison, second, third, etc.). Examples include the minor third or perfect fifth. These names identify not only the difference in semitones between the upper and lower notes but also how the interval is spelled. The importance of spelling stems from the historical practice of differentiating the frequency ratios of enharmonic intervals such as G–G♯ and G–A♭.

== Size ==
Example: Minor third on D in equal temperament: 300 cents.

The size of an interval (also known as its width) can be represented using two alternative and equivalently valid methods, each appropriate to a different context: frequency ratios or cents.

=== Frequency ratios ===
The size of an interval between two notes may be measured by the ratio of their frequencies. When a musical instrument is tuned using a just intonation tuning system, the size of the main intervals can be expressed by small-integer ratios, such as 1:1 (unison), 2:1 (octave), 5:3 (major sixth), 3:2 (perfect fifth), 4:3 (perfect fourth), 5:4 (major third), 6:5 (minor third). Intervals with small-integer ratios are often called just intervals, or pure intervals.

Most commonly, however, musical instruments are nowadays tuned using a different tuning system, called 12-tone equal temperament. As a consequence, the size of most equal-tempered intervals cannot be expressed by small-integer ratios, although it is very close to the size of the corresponding just intervals. For instance, an equal-tempered fifth has a frequency ratio of 2^{7/12}:1, approximately equal to 1.498:1, or 2.997:2 (very close to 3:2). For a comparison between the size of intervals in different tuning systems, see § Size of intervals used in different tuning systems.

=== Cents ===
The standard system for comparing interval sizes is with cents. The cent is a logarithmic unit of measurement. If frequency is expressed in a logarithmic scale, and along that scale the distance between a given frequency and its double (also called octave) is divided into 1200 equal parts, each of these parts is one cent. In twelve-tone equal temperament (12-TET), a tuning system in which all semitones have the same size, the size of one semitone is exactly 100 cents. Hence, in 12-TET the cent can be also defined as one hundredth of a semitone.

Mathematically, the size in cents of the interval from frequency f_{1} to frequency f_{2} is

$$n = 1200 \cdot \log_2 \left( \frac{f_2}{f_1} \right)$$

== Main intervals ==
The table shows the most widely used conventional names for the intervals between the notes of a chromatic scale. A perfect unison (also known as perfect prime) is an interval formed by two identical notes. Its size is zero cents. A semitone is any interval between two adjacent notes in a chromatic scale, a whole tone is an interval spanning two semitones (for example, a major second), and a tritone is an interval spanning three tones, or six semitones (for example, an augmented fourth). (Note: The term tritone is sometimes used more strictly as a synonym of augmented fourth (A4).) Rarely, the term ditone is also used to indicate an interval spanning two whole tones (for example, a major third), or more strictly as a synonym of major third.

Intervals with different names may span the same number of semitones, and may even have the same width. For instance, the interval from D to F♯ is a major third, while that from D to G♭ is a diminished fourth. However, they both span 4 semitones. If the instrument is tuned so that the 12 notes of the chromatic scale are equally spaced (as in equal temperament), these intervals also have the same width. Namely, all semitones have a width of 100 cents, and all intervals spanning 4 semitones are 400 cents wide.

The names listed here cannot be determined by counting semitones alone. The rules to determine them are explained below. Other names, determined with different naming conventions, are listed in a separate section. Intervals smaller than one semitone (commas or microtones) and larger than one octave (compound intervals) are introduced below.

Number of semitones	Minor, major, or perfect intervals	Short	Augmented or diminished intervals	Short	Widely used alternative names	Short	Audio
0	Perfect unison	P1	Diminished second	d2			
1	Minor second	m2	Augmented unison	A1	Semitone, half tone, half step	S	
2	Major second	M2	Diminished third	d3	Tone, whole tone, whole step	T	
3	Minor third	m3	Augmented second	A2	Trisemitone		
4	Major third	M3	Diminished fourth	d4			
5	Perfect fourth	P4	Augmented third	A3			
6			Diminished fifth	d5	Tritone	TT	
6			Augmented fourth	A4	Tritone	TT	
7	Perfect fifth	P5	Diminished sixth	d6			
8	Minor sixth	m6	Augmented fifth	A5			
9	Major sixth	M6	Diminished seventh	d7			
10	Minor seventh	m7	Augmented sixth	A6			
11	Major seventh	M7	Diminished octave	d8			
12	Perfect octave	P8	Augmented seventh	A7			

== Interval number and quality ==
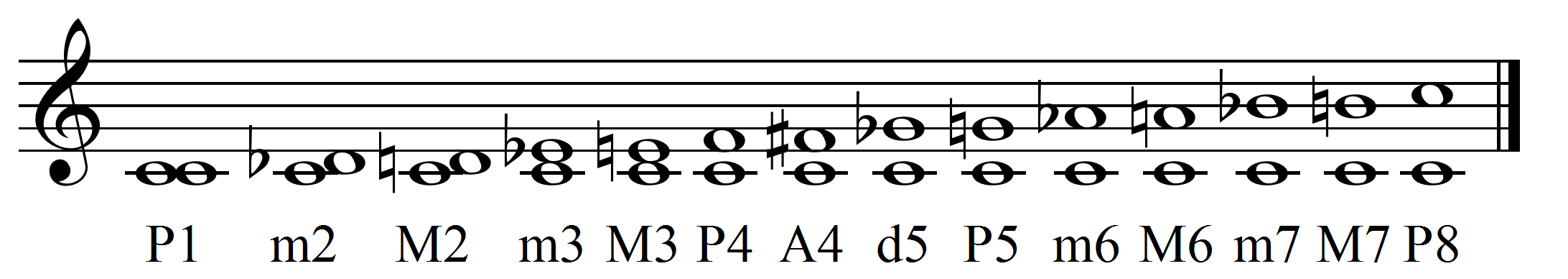
Main intervals from C

In Western music theory, an interval is named according to its number (also called diatonic number, interval size or generic interval) and quality. For instance, major third (or M3) is an interval name, in which the term major (M) describes the quality of the interval, and third (3) indicates its number.

=== Number ===
Staff, with staff positions indicated

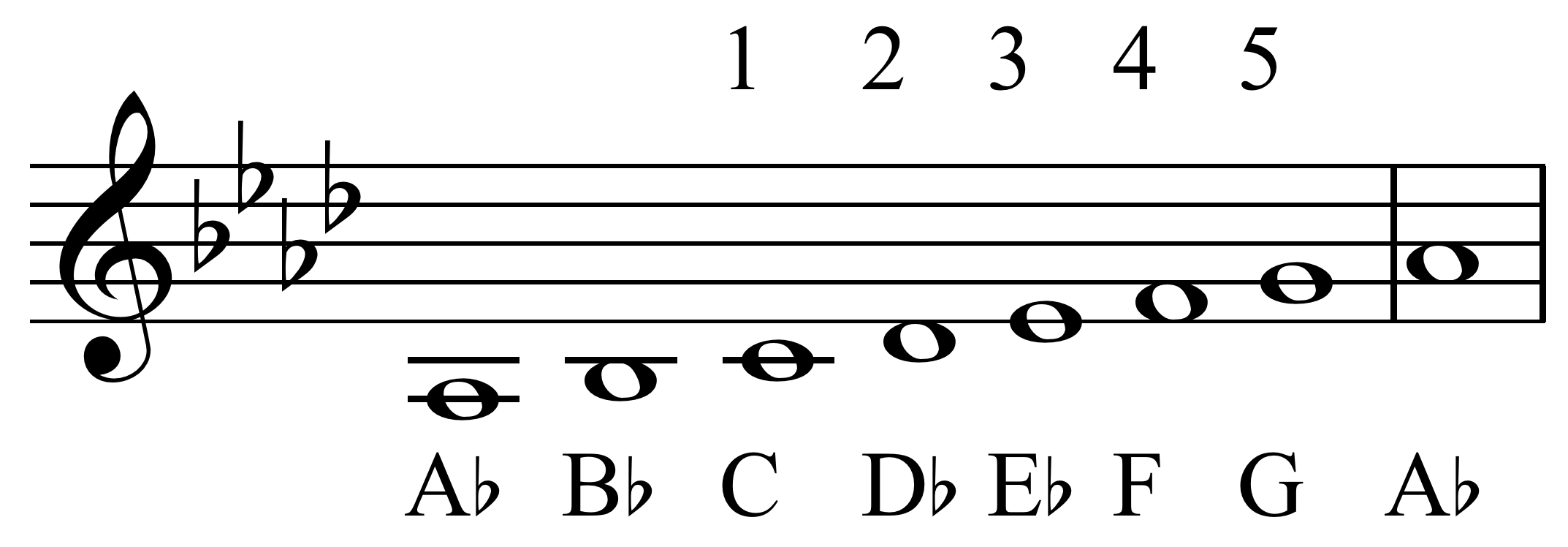
Fifth from C to G in the A♭ major scale

The number of an interval is the number of letter names or staff positions (lines and spaces) it encompasses, including the positions of both notes forming the interval. For instance, the interval B–D is a third (denoted m3) because the notes from B to the D above it encompass three letter names (B, C, D) and occupy three consecutive staff positions, including the positions of B and D. The table and the figure above show intervals with numbers ranging from 1 (e.g., P1) to 8 (e.g., d8). Intervals with larger numbers are called compound intervals.

There is a one-to-one correspondence between staff positions and diatonic-scale degrees (the notes of the diatonic scale). (Note: The expression "diatonic scale" is herein strictly defined as a 7-tone scale, which is either a sequence of successive natural notes (such as the C-major scale, C–D–E–F–G–A–B, or the A-minor scale, A–B–C–D–E–F–G) or any transposition thereof. In other words, a scale that can be written using seven consecutive notes without accidentals on a staff with a conventional key signature, or with no signature. This includes, for instance, the major and the natural minor scales, but does not include some other seven-tone scales, such as the melodic minor and the harmonic minor scales (see also Diatonic and chromatic).) This means that interval numbers can also be determined by counting diatonic-scale degrees, rather than staff positions, provided that the two notes that form the interval are drawn from a diatonic scale. Namely, B–D is a third because in any diatonic scale that contains B and D, the sequence from B to D includes three notes. For instance, in the B-natural minor diatonic scale, the three notes are B–C♯–D. This is not true for all kinds of scales. For instance, in a chromatic scale, there are four notes from B to D: B–C–C♯–D. This is the reason interval numbers are also called diatonic numbers, and this convention is called diatonic numbering.

If one adds any accidentals to the notes that form an interval, by definition the notes do not change their staff positions. As a consequence, any interval has the same interval number as the corresponding natural interval, formed by the same notes without accidentals. For instance, the intervals B–D♯ (spanning 4 semitones) and B–D♭ (spanning 2 semitones) are thirds, like the corresponding natural interval B–D (3 semitones).

Notice that interval numbers represent an inclusive count of encompassed staff positions or note names, not the difference between the endpoints. In other words, one starts counting the lower pitch as one, not zero. For that reason, the interval E–E, a perfect unison, is also called a prime (meaning "1"), even though there is no difference between the endpoints. Continuing, the interval E–F♯ is a second, but F♯ is only one staff position, or diatonic-scale degree, above E. Similarly, E–G♯ is a third, but G♯ is only two staff positions above E, and so on. As a consequence, joining two intervals always yields an interval number one less than their sum. For instance, the intervals B–D and D–F♯ are thirds, but joined they form a fifth (B–F♯), not a sixth. Similarly, a stack of three thirds, such as B–D, D–F♯, and F♯–A, is a seventh (B–A), not a ninth.

This scheme applies to intervals up to an octave (12 semitones). For larger intervals, see § Compound intervals below.

=== Quality ===
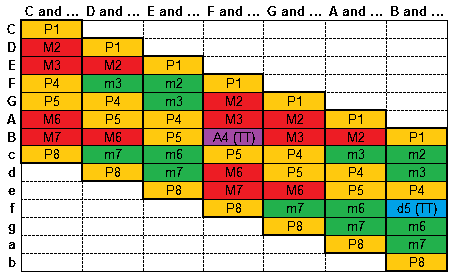
Intervals formed by the notes of a C major diatonic scale

Intervals starting from C on musical keyboard (black keys are all flats). To the right, white keys are Major (except Perfect) and black keys are minor or diminished; to the left, white keys are minor (except Perfect) and black keys are Major or Augmented.

The name of any interval is further qualified using the terms perfect (P), major (M), minor (m), augmented (A), and diminished (d). This is called its interval quality (or modifier). It is possible to have doubly diminished and doubly augmented intervals, but these are quite rare, as they occur only in chromatic contexts. The combination of number (or generic interval) and quality (or modifier) is called the specific interval, diatonic interval (sometimes used only for intervals appearing in the diatonic scale), or simply interval.

The quality of a compound interval is the quality of the simple interval on which it is based. Some other qualifiers like neutral, subminor, and supermajor are used for non-diatonic intervals.

==== Perfect ====
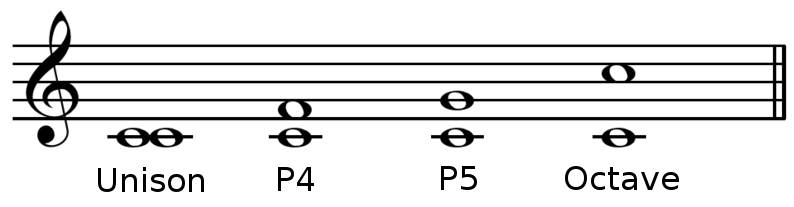
Perfect intervals on C: PU, P4, P5, P8

Perfect intervals are so-called because they were traditionally considered perfectly consonant, although in Western classical music the perfect fourth was sometimes regarded as a less than perfect consonance, when its function was contrapuntal. Conversely, minor, major, augmented, or diminished intervals are typically considered less consonant, and were traditionally classified as mediocre consonances, imperfect consonances, or near-dissonances.

Within a diatonic scale all unisons (P1) and octaves (P8) are perfect. Most fourths and fifths are also perfect (P4 and P5), with five and seven semitones respectively. One occurrence of a fourth is augmented (A4) and one fifth is diminished (d5), both spanning six semitones. For instance, in an E-major scale, the A4 is between A and D♯, and the d5 is between D♯ and A.

The inversion of a perfect interval is also perfect. Since the inversion does not change the pitch class of the two notes, it hardly affects their level of consonance (matching of their harmonics). Conversely, other kinds of intervals have the opposite quality with respect to their inversion. The inversion of a major interval is a minor interval, and the inversion of an augmented interval is a diminished interval.

==== Major and minor ====
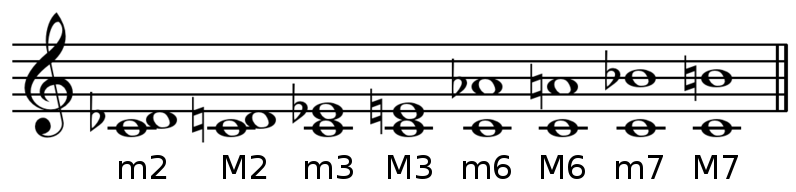
Major and minor intervals on C: m2, M2, m3, M3, m6, M6, m7, M7

As shown in the table, a diatonic scale defines seven intervals for each interval number, each starting from a different note (seven unisons, seven seconds, etc.). The intervals formed by the notes of a diatonic scale are called diatonic. Except for unisons and octaves, the diatonic intervals with a given interval number always occur in two sizes, which differ by one semitone. For example, six of the fifths span seven semitones. The other one spans six semitones. Four of the thirds span three semitones, the others four. If one of the two versions is a perfect interval, the other is called either diminished (i.e. narrowed by one semitone) or augmented (i.e. widened by one semitone). Otherwise, the larger version is called major, the smaller one minor. For instance, since a 7-semitone fifth is a perfect interval (P5), the 6-semitone fifth is called "diminished fifth" (d5). Conversely, since neither kind of third is perfect, the larger one is called "major third" (M3), the smaller one "minor third" (m3).

Within a diatonic scale, unisons and octaves are always qualified as perfect, fourths as either perfect or augmented, fifths as perfect or diminished, and all the other intervals (seconds, thirds, sixths, sevenths) as major or minor.

==== Augmented and diminished ====
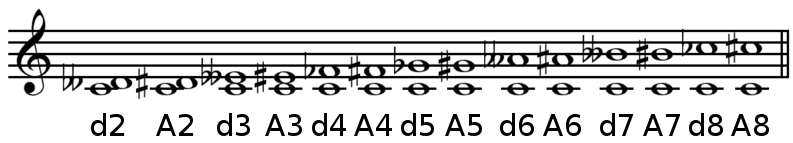
Augmented and diminished intervals on C: d2, A2, d3, A3, d4, A4, d5, A5, d6, A6, d7, A7, d8, A8

Augmented intervals are wider by one semitone than perfect or major intervals, while having the same interval number (i.e., encompassing the same number of staff positions): they are wider by a chromatic semitone. Diminished intervals, on the other hand, are narrower by one semitone than perfect or minor intervals of the same interval number: they are narrower by a chromatic semitone. For instance, an augmented sixth such as E♭–C♯ spans ten semitones, exceeding a major sixth (E♭–C) by one semitone, while a diminished sixth such as E♯–C spans seven semitones, falling short of a minor sixth (E♯–C♯) by one semitone.

The augmented fourth (A4) and the diminished fifth (d5) are the only augmented and diminished intervals that appear in diatonic scales (see table).

=== Example ===
Neither the number, nor the quality of an interval can be determined by counting semitones alone. As explained above, the number of staff positions must be taken into account as well.

For example, as shown in the table below, there are six semitones between C and F♯, C and G♭, and C♭ and E♯, but

- C–F♯ is a fourth, as it encompasses four staff positions (C, D, E, F), and it is augmented, as it exceeds a perfect fourth (such as C–F) by one semitone.
- C–G♭ is a fifth, as it encompasses five staff positions (C, D, E, F, G), and it is diminished, as it falls short of a perfect fifth (such as C-G) by one semitone.
- C♭–E♯ is a third, as it encompasses three staff positions (C, D, E), and it is doubly augmented, as it exceeds a major third (such as C–E) by two semitones.

Number of semitones	Interval name	Staff positions				
Number of semitones	Interval name	1	2	3	4	5
6	augmented fourth (A4)	C			F♯	
6	diminished fifth (d5)	C				G♭
6	doubly augmented third (AA3)	C♭		E♯		
7	triply augmented third (AAA3)	C♭			E	

== Shorthand notation ==
Intervals are often abbreviated with a P for perfect, m for minor, M for major, d for diminished, A for augmented, followed by the interval number. The indications M and P are often omitted. The octave is P8, and a unison is usually referred to simply as "a unison" but can be labeled P1. The tritone, an augmented fourth or diminished fifth is often TT. The interval qualities may be also abbreviated with perf, min, maj, dim, aug. Examples:

- m2 (or min2): minor second,
- M3 (or maj3): major third,
- A4 (or aug4): augmented fourth,
- d5 (or dim5): diminished fifth,
- P5 (or perf5): perfect fifth.

== Inversion ==
A simple interval (i.e., an interval smaller than or equal to an octave) may be inverted by raising the lower pitch an octave or lowering the upper pitch an octave. For example, the fourth from a lower C to a higher F may be inverted to make a fifth, from a lower F to a higher C.

There are two rules to determine the number and quality of the inversion of any simple interval:

1. The interval number and the number of its inversion always add up to nine (4 + 5 = 9, in the example just given).
2. The inversion of a major interval is a minor interval, and vice versa; the inversion of a perfect interval is also perfect; the inversion of an augmented interval is a diminished interval, and vice versa; the inversion of a doubly augmented interval is a doubly diminished interval, and vice versa.

For example, the interval from C to the E♭ above it is a minor third. By the two rules just given, the interval from E♭ to the C above it must be a major sixth.

Since compound intervals are larger than an octave, "the inversion of any compound interval is always the same as the inversion of the simple interval from which it is compounded".

For intervals identified by their ratio, the inversion is determined by reversing the ratio and multiplying the ratio by 2 until it is greater than 1. For example, the inversion of a 5:4 ratio is an 8:5 ratio.

For intervals identified by an integer number of semitones, the inversion is obtained by subtracting that number from 12.

Since an interval class is the lower number selected among the interval integer and its inversion, interval classes cannot be inverted.

== Classification ==
Intervals can be described, classified, or compared with each other according to various criteria.

Melodic and harmonic intervals

=== Melodic and harmonic ===
An interval can be described as

- Vertical or harmonic if the two notes sound simultaneously
- Horizontal, linear, or melodic if they sound successively. Melodic intervals can be ascending (lower pitch precedes higher pitch) or descending.

=== Steps and skips ===
Linear (melodic) intervals may be described as steps or skips. A step, or conjunct motion, is a linear interval between two consecutive notes of a scale. Any larger interval is called a skip (also called a leap), or disjunct motion. In the diatonic scale, a step is either a minor second (sometimes also called half step) or major second (sometimes also called whole step), with all intervals of a minor third or larger being skips.

For example, C–D (major second) is a step, whereas C–E (major third) is a skip.

More generally, a step is a smaller or narrower interval in a musical line, and a skip is a wider or larger interval, where the categorization of intervals into steps and skips is determined by the tuning system and the pitch space used.

Melodic motion in which the interval between any two consecutive pitches is no more than a step, or, less strictly, where skips are rare, is called stepwise or conjunct melodic motion, as opposed to skipwise or disjunct melodic motions, characterized by frequent skips.

=== Diatonic and chromatic ===
In general,

- A diatonic interval is an interval formed by two notes of a diatonic scale.
- A chromatic interval is a non-diatonic interval formed by two notes of a chromatic scale.

Ascending and descending chromatic scale on C

The table above depicts the 56 diatonic intervals formed by the notes of the C major scale (a diatonic scale). Notice that these intervals, as well as any other diatonic interval, can be also formed by the notes of a chromatic scale.

The distinction between diatonic and chromatic intervals is controversial, as it is based on the definition of the diatonic scale, which is variable in the literature. For example, the interval B–E♭ (a diminished fourth, occurring in the harmonic C-minor scale) is considered diatonic if the harmonic minor scales are considered diatonic as well. Otherwise, it is considered chromatic. For further details, see the main article.

By a commonly used definition of the diatonic scale (which excludes the harmonic minor and melodic minor scales), all perfect, major and minor intervals are diatonic. Conversely, no augmented or diminished interval is diatonic, except for the augmented fourth and diminished fifth.

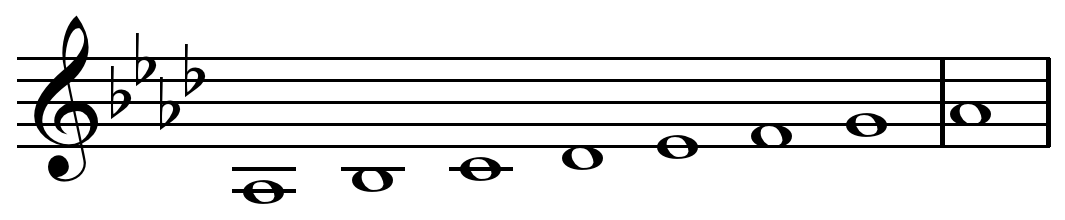
A♭-major scale

The distinction between diatonic and chromatic intervals may be also sensitive to context. The above-mentioned 56 intervals formed by the C-major scale are sometimes called diatonic to C major. All other intervals are called chromatic to C major. For instance, the perfect fifth A♭–E♭ is chromatic to C major, because A♭ and E♭ are not contained in the C major scale. However, it is diatonic to others, such as the A♭ major scale.

=== Consonant and dissonant ===
Consonance and dissonance are relative terms that refer to the stability, or state of repose, of particular musical effects. Dissonant intervals are those that cause tension and desire to be resolved to consonant intervals.

These terms are relative to the usage of different compositional styles.

- In 15th- and 16th-century usage, perfect fifths and octaves, and major and minor thirds and sixths were considered harmonically consonant, and all other intervals dissonant, including the perfect fourth, which by 1473 was described (by Johannes Tinctoris) as dissonant, except between the upper parts of a vertical sonority—for example, with a supporting third below ("6-3 chords"). In the common practice period, it makes more sense to speak of consonant and dissonant chords, and certain intervals previously considered dissonant (such as minor sevenths) became acceptable in certain contexts. However, 16th-century practice was still taught to beginning musicians throughout this period.
- Hermann von Helmholtz (1821–1894) theorised that dissonance was caused by the presence of beats. Helmholtz further believed that the beating produced by the upper partials of harmonic sounds was the cause of dissonance for intervals too far apart to produce beating between the fundamentals. Helmholtz then designated that two harmonic tones that shared common low partials would be more consonant, as they produced fewer beats. Helmholtz disregarded partials above the seventh, as he believed that they were not audible enough to have significant effect. From this Helmholtz categorises the octave, perfect fifth, perfect fourth, major sixth, major third, and minor third as consonant, in decreasing value, and other intervals as dissonant.
- David Cope (1997) suggests the concept of interval strength, in which an interval's strength, consonance, or stability is determined by its approximation to a lower and stronger, or higher and weaker, position in the harmonic series. See also: Lipps–Meyer law and Interval root

All of the above analyses refer to vertical (simultaneous) intervals.

=== Simple and compound ===
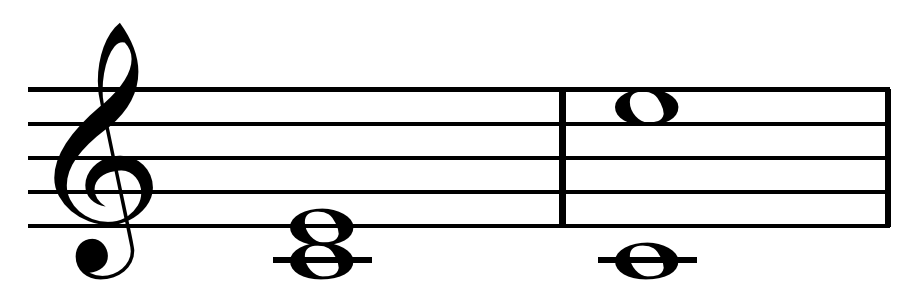
Simple and compound major third

A simple interval is an interval spanning at most one octave (see Main intervals above). Intervals spanning more than one octave are called compound intervals, as they can be obtained by adding one or more octaves to a simple interval (see below for details).

=== Enharmonic intervals ===
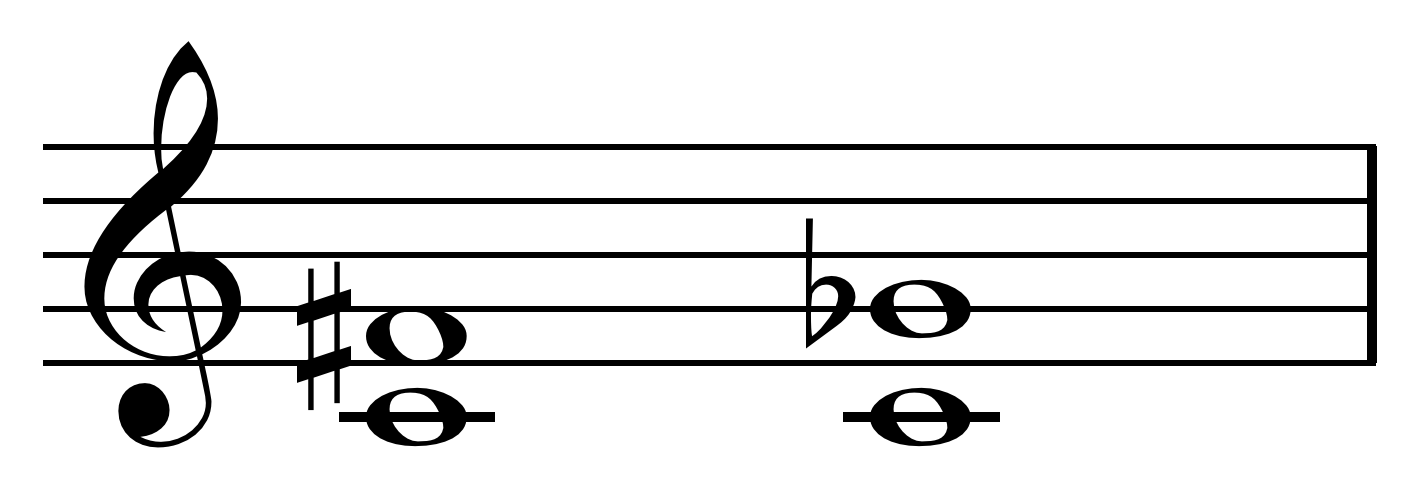
Enharmonic tritones: A4 = d5 on C

Two intervals are considered enharmonic, or enharmonically equivalent, if they both contain the same pitches spelled in different ways; that is, if the notes in the two intervals are themselves enharmonically equivalent. Enharmonic intervals span the same number of semitones.

For example, the four intervals listed in the table below are all enharmonically equivalent, because the notes F♯ and G♭ indicate the same pitch, and the same is true for A♯ and B♭. All these intervals span four semitones.

Number of semitones	Interval name	Staff positions			
Number of semitones	Interval name	1	2	3	4
4	major third	F♯		A♯	
4	major third		G♭		B♭
4	diminished fourth	F♯			B♭
4	doubly augmented second		G♭	A♯	

When played as isolated chords on a piano keyboard, these intervals are indistinguishable to the ear, because they are all played with the same two keys. However, in a musical context, the diatonic function of the notes these intervals incorporate is very different.

The discussion above assumes the use of the prevalent tuning system, 12-tone equal temperament ("12-TET"). But in other historic meantone temperaments, the pitches of pairs of notes such as F♯ and G♭ may not necessarily coincide. These two notes are enharmonic in 12-TET, but may not be so in another tuning system. In such cases, the intervals they form would also not be enharmonic. For example, in quarter-comma meantone, all four intervals shown in the example above would be different.

== Minute intervals ==
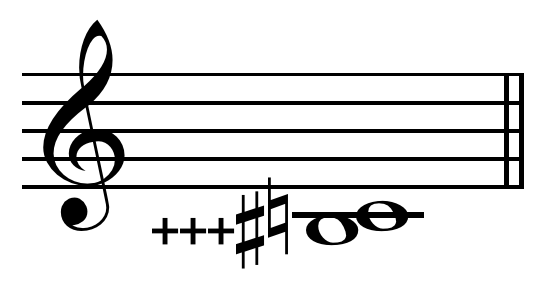
Pythagorean comma on C; the note depicted as lower on the staff (B♯+++) is slightly higher in pitch (than C♮).

There are also a number of minute intervals not found in the chromatic scale or labeled with a diatonic function, which have names of their own. They may be described as microtones, and some of them can be also classified as commas, as they describe small discrepancies, observed in some tuning systems, between enharmonically equivalent notes. In the following list, the interval sizes in cents are approximate.

- A Pythagorean comma is the difference between twelve justly tuned perfect fifths and seven octaves. It is expressed by the frequency ratio 531441:524288 (23.5 cents).
- A syntonic comma is the difference between four justly tuned perfect fifths and two octaves plus a major third. It is expressed by the ratio 81:80 (21.5 cents).
- A septimal comma is 64:63 (27.3 cents), and is the difference between the Pythagorean or 3-limit "7th" and the "harmonic 7th".
- A diesis is generally used to mean the difference between three justly tuned major thirds and one octave. It is expressed by the ratio 128:125 (41.1 cents). However, it has been used to mean other small intervals: see diesis for details.
- A diaschisma is the difference between three octaves and four justly tuned perfect fifths plus two justly tuned major thirds. It is expressed by the ratio 2048:2025 (19.6 cents).
- A schisma (also skhisma) is the difference between five octaves and eight justly tuned fifths plus one justly tuned major third. It is expressed by the ratio 32805:32768 (2.0 cents). It is also the difference between the Pythagorean and syntonic commas. (A schismic major third is a schisma different from a just major third, eight fifths down and five octaves up, F♭ in C.)
- A kleisma is the difference between six minor thirds and one tritave or perfect twelfth (an octave plus a perfect fifth), with a frequency ratio of 15625:15552 (8.1 cents).
- A septimal kleisma is the amount that two major thirds of 5:4 and a septimal major third, or supermajor third, of 9:7 exceeds the octave. Ratio 225:224 (7.7 cents).
- A quarter tone is half the width of a semitone, which is half the width of a whole tone. It is equal to exactly 50 cents.

== Compound intervals ==
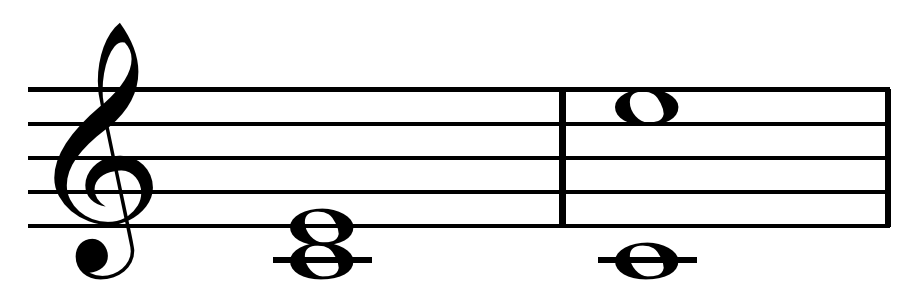
Simple and compound major third

A compound interval is an interval spanning more than one octave. Conversely, intervals spanning at most one octave are called simple intervals (see Main intervals below).

In general, a compound interval may be defined by a sequence or "stack" of two or more simple intervals of any kind. For instance, a major tenth (two staff positions above one octave), also called compound major third, spans one octave plus one major third.

Any compound interval can be always decomposed into one or more octaves plus one simple interval. For instance, a major seventeenth can be decomposed into two octaves and one major third, and this is the reason why it is called a compound major third, even when it is built by adding up four fifths.

The diatonic number DN_{c} of a compound interval formed from n simple intervals with diatonic numbers DN_{1}, DN_{2}, ..., DN_{n}, is determined by:

$$DN_c = 1 + (DN_1 - 1) + (DN_2 - 1) + ... + (DN_n - 1), \$$

which can also be written as:

$$DN_c = DN_1 + DN_2 + ... + DN_n - (n - 1), \$$

The quality of a compound interval is determined by the quality of the simple interval on which it is based. For instance, a compound major third is a major tenth (1+(8−1)+(3−1) = 10), or a major seventeenth (1+(8−1)+(8−1)+(3−1) = 17), and a compound perfect fifth is a perfect twelfth (1+(8−1)+(5−1) = 12) or a perfect nineteenth (1+(8−1)+(8−1)+(5−1) = 19). Notice that two octaves are a fifteenth, not a sixteenth (1+(8−1)+(8−1) = 15). Similarly, three octaves are a twenty-second (1+3×(8−1) = 22), four octaves are a twenty-ninth (1+3×(8-1) = 29), and so on.

=== Main compound intervals ===
Number of semitones	Minor, major, or perfect intervals	Short	Augmented or diminished intervals	Short
12			Diminished ninth	d9
13	Minor ninth	m9	Augmented octave	A8
14	Major ninth	M9	Diminished tenth	d10
15	Minor tenth	m10	Augmented ninth	A9
16	Major tenth	M10	Diminished eleventh	d11
17	Perfect eleventh	P11	Augmented tenth	A10
18			Diminished twelfth	d12
18			Augmented eleventh	A11
19	Perfect twelfth or Tritave	P12	Diminished thirteenth	d13
20	Minor thirteenth	m13	Augmented twelfth	A12
21	Major thirteenth	M13	Diminished fourteenth	d14
22	Minor fourteenth	m14	Augmented thirteenth	A13
23	Major fourteenth	M14	Diminished fifteenth	d15
24	Perfect fifteenth or Double octave	P15	Augmented fourteenth	A14
25			Augmented fifteenth	A15

It is also worth mentioning here the major seventeenth (28 semitones)—an interval larger than two octaves that can be considered a multiple of a perfect fifth (7 semitones) as it can be decomposed into four perfect fifths (7 × 4 = 28 semitones), or two octaves plus a major third (12 + 12 + 4 = 28 semitones). Intervals larger than a major seventeenth seldom come up, most often being referred to by their compound names, for example "two octaves plus a fifth" rather than "a 19th".

== Intervals in chords ==
Chords are sets of three or more notes. They are typically defined as the combination of intervals starting from a common note called the root of the chord. For instance a major triad is a chord containing three notes defined by the root and two intervals (major third and perfect fifth). Sometimes even a single interval (dyad) is considered a chord. Chords are classified based on the quality and number of the intervals that define them.

=== Chord qualities and interval qualities ===
The main chord qualities are major, minor, augmented, diminished, half-diminished, and dominant. The symbols used for chord quality are similar to those used for interval quality (see above). In addition, + or aug is used for augmented, ° or dim for diminished, ^{ø} for half diminished, and dom for dominant (the symbol − alone is not used for diminished).

=== Deducing component intervals from chord names and symbols ===
The main rules to decode chord names or symbols are summarized below. Further details are given at Rules to decode chord names and symbols.

1. For 3-note chords (triads), major or minor always refer to the interval of the third above the root note, while augmented and diminished always refer to the interval of the fifth above root. The same is true for the corresponding symbols (e.g., Cm means C^{m3}, and C+ means C^{+5}). Thus, the terms third and fifth and the corresponding symbols 3 and 5 are typically omitted. This rule can be generalized to all kinds of chords, (Note: General rule 1 achieves consistency in the interpretation of symbols such as CM^{7}, Cm^{6}, and C+^{7}. Some musicians legitimately prefer to think that, in CM^{7}, M refers to the seventh, rather than to the third. This alternative approach is legitimate, as both the third and seventh are major, yet it is inconsistent, as a similar interpretation is impossible for Cm^{6} and C+^{7} (in Cm^{6}, m cannot possibly refer to the sixth, which is major by definition, and in C+^{7}, + cannot refer to the seventh, which is minor). Both approaches reveal only one of the intervals (M3 or M7), and require other rules to complete the task. Whatever is the decoding method, the result is the same (e.g., CM^{7} is always conventionally decoded as C–E–G–B, implying M3, P5, M7). The advantage of rule 1 is that it has no exceptions, which makes it the simplest possible approach to decode chord quality. According to the two approaches, some may format the major seventh chord as CM^{7} (general rule 1: M refers to M3), and others as C^{M7} (alternative approach: M refers to M7). Fortunately, even C^{M7} becomes compatible with rule 1 if it is considered an abbreviation of CM^{M7}, in which the first M is omitted. The omitted M is the quality of the third, and is deduced according to rule 2 (see above), consistently with the interpretation of the plain symbol C, which by the same rule stands for CM.) provided the above-mentioned qualities appear immediately after the root note, or at the beginning of the chord name or symbol. For instance, in the chord symbols Cm and Cm^{7}, m refers to the interval m3, and 3 is omitted. When these qualities do not appear immediately after the root note, or at the beginning of the name or symbol, they should be considered interval qualities, rather than chord qualities. For instance, in Cm^{M7} (minor major seventh chord), m is the chord quality and refers to the m3 interval, while M refers to the M7 interval. When the number of an extra interval is specified immediately after chord quality, the quality of that interval may coincide with chord quality (e.g., CM^{7} = CM^{M7}). However, this is not always true (e.g., Cm^{6} = Cm^{M6}, C+^{7} = C+^{m7}, CM^{11} = CM^{P11}). See main article for further details.
2. Without contrary information, a major third interval and a perfect fifth interval (major triad) are implied. For instance, a C chord is a C major triad, and the name C minor seventh (Cm^{7}) implies a minor 3rd by rule 1, a perfect 5th by this rule, and a minor 7th by definition (see below). This rule has one exception (see next rule).
3. When the fifth interval is diminished, the third must be minor. (Note: All triads are tertian chords (chords defined by sequences of thirds), and a major third would produce in this case a non-tertian chord. Namely, the diminished fifth spans 6 semitones from root, thus it may be decomposed into a sequence of two minor thirds, each spanning 3 semitones (m3 + m3), compatible with the definition of tertian chord. If a major third were used (4 semitones), this would entail a sequence containing a major second (M3 + M2 = 4 + 2 semitones = 6 semitones), which would not meet the definition of tertian chord.) This rule overrides rule 2. For instance, Cdim^{7} implies a diminished 5th by rule 1, a minor 3rd by this rule, and a diminished 7th by definition (see below).
4. Names and symbols that contain only a plain interval number (e.g., "seventh chord") or the chord root and a number (e.g., "C seventh", or C^{7}) are interpreted as follows:
  - If the number is 2, 4, 6, etc., the chord is a major added tone chord (e.g., C^{6} = C^{M6} = C^{add6}) and contains, together with the implied major triad, an extra major 2nd, perfect 4th, or major 6th (see names and symbols for added tone chords).
  - If the number is 7, 9, 11, 13, etc., the chord is dominant (e.g., C^{7} = C^{dom7}) and contains, together with the implied major triad, one or more of the following extra intervals: minor 7th, major 9th, perfect 11th, and major 13th (see names and symbols for seventh and extended chords).
  - If the number is 5, the chord (technically not a chord in the traditional sense, but a dyad) is a power chord. Only the root, a perfect fifth and usually an octave are played.

The table shows the intervals contained in some of the main chords (component intervals), and some of the symbols used to denote them. The interval qualities or numbers in boldface font can be deduced from chord name or symbol by applying rule 1. In symbol examples, C is used as chord root.

Main chords		Component intervals		
Name	Symbol examples	Third	Fifth	Seventh
Major triad	C	M3	P5	
Major triad	CM, or Cmaj	**M**3	P5	
Minor triad	Cm, or Cmin	**m**3	P5	
Augmented triad	C+, or Caug	M3	**A**5	
Minormented triad	C+♭3, or Caugm	m3	**A**5	
Diminished triad	C^{o}, or Cdim	m3	**d**5	
Dominant seventh chord	C^{7}, or C^{dom7}	M3	P5	m**7**
Minor seventh chord	Cm^{7}, or Cmin^{7}	**m**3	P5	m**7**
Major seventh chord	CM^{7}, or Cmaj^{7}	**M**3	P5	M**7**
Augmented seventh chord	C+^{7}, Caug^{7}, C^{7♯5}, or C^{7aug5}	M3	**A**5	m**7**
Augmented major seventh chord	C+^{M7}, Caug^{M7},, C^{M7aug5}	M3	**A**5	M**7**
Augmented major seventh ♭3 chord	C+^{M7b3}, Caug^{M7}♭3,, C^{M7aug5b3}	m3	**A**5	M**7**
Diminished seventh chord	C^{o}^{7}, or Cdim^{7}	m3	**d**5	d**7**
Half-diminished seventh chord	C^{ø}^{7}, Cm^{7♭5}, or Cm^{7dim5}	m3	**d**5	m**7**

== Size of intervals used in different tuning systems ==
Number of semitones	Name	5-limit tuning (pitch ratio)	Comparison of interval width (in cents)			
Number of semitones	Name	5-limit tuning (pitch ratio)	5-limit tuning	Pythagorean tuning	1/4-comma meantone	Equal temperament
0	Perfect unison	**1:1**	**0**	**0**	**0**	**0**
1	Minor second	**16:15**; 27:25	**112**; 133	90	117	100
2	Major second	**9:8**; 10:9	**204**; 182	**204**	193	200
3	Minor third	**6:5**; 32:27	**316**; 294	294; 318	310 (wolf) 269	300
4	Major third	**5:4**	**386**	408; 384	**386** (wolf) 427	400
5	Perfect fourth	**4:3**; 27:20	**498**; 520	**498** (wolf) 522	503 (wolf) 462	500
6	Augmented fourth Diminished fifth	**45:32**; **25:18**	**590**; **569**	612; 588	579; 621	600
7	Perfect fifth	**3:2**; 40:27	**702**; 680	**702** (wolf) 678	697 (wolf) 738	700
8	Minor sixth	**8:5**	**814**	792	**814**	800
9	Major sixth	**5:3**; 27:16	**884**; 906	906	890	900
10	Minor seventh	**16:9**; 9:5	**996**; 1018	**996**	1007	1000
11	Major seventh	**15:8**; 50:27	**1088**; 1067	1110	1083	1100
12	Perfect octave	**2:1**	**1200**	**1200**	**1200**	**1200**

In this table, the interval widths used in four different tuning systems are compared. To facilitate comparison, just intervals as provided by 5-limit tuning (see symmetric scale n.1) are shown in bold font, and the values in cents are rounded to integers. Notice that in each of the non-equal tuning systems, by definition the width of each type of interval (including the semitone) changes depending on the note that starts the interval. This is the art of just intonation. In equal temperament, the intervals are never precisely in tune with each other. This is the price of using equidistant intervals in a 12-tone scale. For simplicity, for some types of interval the table shows only one value (the most often observed one).

In 1/4-comma meantone, by definition 11 perfect fifths have a size of approximately 697 cents (700 − ε cents, where ε ≈ 3.42 cents); since the average size of the 12 fifths must equal exactly 700 cents (as in equal temperament), the other one must have a size of about 738 cents (700 + 11ε, the wolf fifth or diminished sixth); 8 major thirds have size about 386 cents (400 − 4ε), 4 have size about 427 cents (400 + 8ε, actually diminished fourths), and their average size is 400 cents. In short, similar differences in width are observed for all interval types, except for unisons and octaves, and they are all multiples of ε (the difference between the 1/4-comma meantone fifth and the average fifth). A more detailed analysis is provided at 1/4-comma meantone Size of intervals. 1/4-comma meantone was designed to produce just major thirds, but only 8 of them are just (5:4, about 386 cents).

The Pythagorean tuning is characterized by smaller differences because they are multiples of a smaller ε (ε ≈ 1.96 cents, the difference between the Pythagorean fifth and the average fifth). Notice that here the fifth is wider than 700 cents, while in most meantone temperaments, including 1/4-comma meantone, it is tempered to a size smaller than 700. A more detailed analysis is provided at Pythagorean tuning § Size of intervals.

The 5-limit tuning system uses just tones and semitones as building blocks, rather than a stack of perfect fifths, and this leads to even more varied intervals throughout the scale (each kind of interval has three or four different sizes). A more detailed analysis is provided at 5-limit tuning § Size of intervals. 5-limit tuning was designed to maximize the number of just intervals, but even in this system some intervals are not just (e.g., 3 fifths, 5 major thirds and 6 minor thirds are not just; also, 3 major and 3 minor thirds are wolf intervals).

The above-mentioned symmetric scale 1, defined in the 5-limit tuning system, is not the only method to obtain just intonation. It is possible to construct juster intervals or just intervals closer to the equal-tempered equivalents, but most of the ones listed above have been used historically in equivalent contexts. In particular, the asymmetric version of the 5-limit tuning scale provides a juster value for the minor seventh (9:5, rather than 16:9). Moreover, the tritone (augmented fourth or diminished fifth), could have other just ratios; for instance, 7:5 (about 583 cents) or 17:12 (about 603 cents) are possible alternatives for the augmented fourth (the latter is fairly common, as it is closer to the equal-tempered value of 600 cents). The 7:4 interval (about 969 cents), also known as the harmonic seventh, has been a contentious issue throughout the history of music theory; it is 31 cents flatter than an equal-tempered minor seventh. For further details about reference ratios, see 5-limit tuning § The justest ratios.

In the diatonic system, every interval has one or more enharmonic equivalents, such as augmented second for minor third.

== Interval root ==
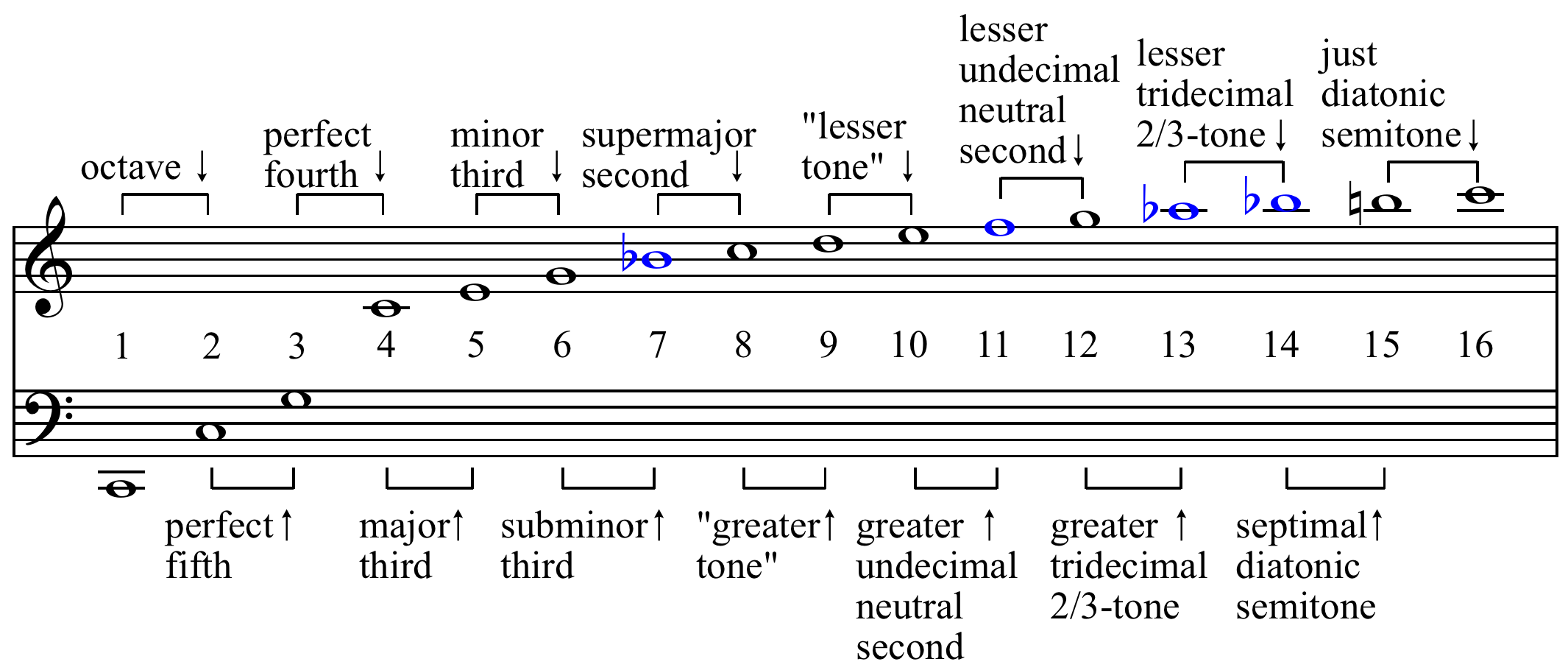
Intervals in the harmonic series

Although intervals are usually designated in relation to their lower note, David Cope and Hindemith both suggest the concept of interval root. To determine an interval's root, one locates its nearest approximation in the harmonic series. The root of a perfect fourth, then, is its top note because it is an octave of the fundamental in the hypothetical harmonic series. The bottom note of every odd diatonically numbered intervals are the roots, as are the tops of all even numbered intervals. The root of a collection of intervals or a chord is thus determined by the interval root of its strongest interval.

As to its usefulness, Cope provides the example of the final tonic chord of some popular music being traditionally analyzable as a "submediant six-five chord" (added sixth chords by popular terminology), or a first inversion seventh chord (possibly the dominant of the mediant V/iii). According to the interval root of the strongest interval of the chord (in first inversion, CEGA), the perfect fifth (C–G), is the bottom C, the tonic.

== Interval cycles ==
Interval cycles, "unfold [i.e., repeat] a single recurrent interval in a series that closes with a return to the initial pitch class", and are notated by George Perle using the letter "C", for cycle, with an interval-class integer to distinguish the interval. Thus the diminished-seventh chord would be C3 and the augmented triad would be C4. A superscript may be added to distinguish between transpositions, using 0–11 to indicate the lowest pitch class in the cycle.

== Alternative interval naming conventions ==
As shown below, some of the above-mentioned intervals have alternative names, and some of them take a specific alternative name in Pythagorean tuning, five-limit tuning, or meantone temperament tuning systems such as quarter-comma meantone. All the intervals with prefix sesqui- are justly tuned, and their frequency ratio, shown in the table, is a superparticular number (or epimoric ratio). The same is true for the octave.

Typically, a comma is a diminished second, but this is not always true (for more details, see Alternative definitions of comma). For instance, in Pythagorean tuning the diminished second is a descending interval (524288:531441, or about −23.5 cents), and the Pythagorean comma is its opposite (531441:524288, or about 23.5 cents). 5-limit tuning defines four kinds of comma, three of which meet the definition of diminished second, and hence are listed in the table below. The fourth one, called syntonic comma (81:80) can neither be regarded as a diminished second, nor as its opposite. See Diminished seconds in 5-limit tuning for further details.

Number of semitones	Generic names				Specific names		
Number of semitones	Quality and number		Other naming convention		Pythagorean tuning	5-limit tuning	1/4-comma meantone
Number of semitones	Full	Short	Other naming convention		Pythagorean tuning	5-limit tuning	1/4-comma meantone
0	perfect unison or perfect prime	P1					
0	diminished second	d2			descending Pythagorean comma (524288:531441)	lesser diesis (128:125)	
0	diminished second	d2			descending Pythagorean comma (524288:531441)	diaschisma (2048:2025) greater diesis (648:625)	
1	minor second	m2	semitone, half tone, half step	diatonic semitone, major semitone	limma (256:243)		
1	augmented unison or augmented prime	A1	semitone, half tone, half step	chromatic semitone, minor semitone	apotome (2187:2048)		
2	major second	M2	tone, whole tone, whole step		sesquioctavum (9:8)		
3	minor third	m3				sesquiquintum (6:5)	
4	major third	M3				sesquiquartum (5:4)	
5	perfect fourth	P4			sesquitertium (4:3)		
6	diminished fifth	d5	tritone				
6	augmented fourth	A4	tritone				
7	perfect fifth	P5			sesquialterum (3:2)		
12	perfect octave	P8			duplex (2:1)		

Additionally, some cultures around the world have their own names for intervals found in their music. For instance, 22 kinds of intervals, called shrutis, are canonically defined in Indian classical music.

=== Latin nomenclature ===
Up to the end of the 18th century, Latin was used as an official language throughout Europe for scientific and music textbooks. In music, many English terms are derived from Latin. For instance, semitone is from Latin semitonus.

The prefix semi- is typically used herein to mean "shorter", rather than "half". Namely, a semitonus, semiditonus, semidiatessaron, semidiapente, semihexachordum, semiheptachordum, or semidiapason, is shorter by one semitone than the corresponding whole interval. For instance, a semiditonus (3 semitones, or about 300 cents) is not half of a ditonus (4 semitones, or about 400 cents), but a ditonus shortened by one semitone. Moreover, in Pythagorean tuning (the most commonly used tuning system up to the 16th century), a semitritonus (d5) is smaller than a tritonus (A4) by one Pythagorean comma (about a quarter of a semitone).

Number of semitones	Quality and number	Short	Latin nomenclature
0	Perfect unison	P1	unisonus
1	Minor second	m2	semitonus
1	Augmented unison	A1	unisonus superfluus
2	Major second	M2	tonus
2	Diminished third	d3	
3	Minor third	m3	semiditonus
3	Augmented second	A2	tonus superfluus
4	Major third	M3	ditonus
4	Diminished fourth	d4	semidiatessaron
5	Perfect fourth	P4	diatessaron
5	Augmented third	A3	ditonus superfluus
6	Diminished fifth	d5	semidiapente, semitritonus
6	Augmented fourth	A4	tritonus
7	Perfect fifth	P5	diapente
7	Diminished sixth	d6	semihexachordum
8	Minor sixth	m6	hexachordum minus, semitonus cum diapente, tetratonus
8	Augmented fifth	A5	diapente superfluum
9	Major sixth	M6	hexachordum maius, tonus cum diapente
9	Diminished seventh	d7	semiheptachordum
10	Minor seventh	m7	heptachordum minus, semiditonus cum diapente, pentatonus
10	Augmented sixth	A6	hexachordum superfluum
11	Major seventh	M7	heptachordum maius, ditonus cum diapente
11	Diminished octave	d8	semidiapason
12	Perfect octave	P8	diapason
12	Augmented seventh	A7	heptachordum superfluum

== Non-diatonic intervals ==
Intervals in non-diatonic scales can be named using analogs of the diatonic interval names, by using a diatonic interval of similar size and distinguishing it by varying the quality, or by adding other modifiers. For example, the just interval 7/6 may be referred to as a subminor third, since it is ~267 cents wide, which is narrower than a minor third (300 cents in 12-TET, ~316 cents for the just interval 6/5), or as the septimal minor third, since it is a 7-limit interval. These names refer just to the individual interval's size, and the interval number need not correspond to the number of scale degrees of a (heptatonic) scale. This naming is particularly common in just intonation and microtonal scales.

The most common of these extended qualities are a neutral interval, in between a minor and major interval; and subminor and supermajor intervals, respectively narrower than a minor or wider than a major interval. The exact size of such intervals depends on the tuning system, but they often vary from the diatonic interval sizes by about a quarter tone (50 cents, half a chromatic step). For example, the neutral second, the characteristic interval of Arabic music, in 24-TET is 150 cents, exactly halfway between a minor second and major second. Combined, these yield the progression diminished, subminor, minor, neutral, major, supermajor, augmented for seconds, thirds, sixths, and sevenths. This naming convention can be extended to unisons, fourths, fifths, and octaves with sub and super, yielding the progression diminished, sub, perfect, super, augmented. This allows one to name all intervals in 24-TET or 31-TET, the latter of which was used by Adriaan Fokker. Various further extensions are used in Xenharmonic music.

== Pitch-class intervals ==
In post-tonal or atonal theory, originally developed for equal-tempered European classical music written using the twelve-tone technique or serialism, integer notation is often used, most prominently in musical set theory. In this system, intervals are named according to the number of half steps, from 0 to 11, the largest interval class being 6.

In atonal or musical set theory, there are numerous types of intervals, the first being the ordered pitch interval, the distance between two pitches upward or downward. For instance, the interval from C upward to G is 7, and the interval from G downward to C is −7. One can also measure the distance between two pitches without taking into account direction with the unordered pitch interval, somewhat similar to the interval of tonal theory.

The interval between pitch classes may be measured with ordered and unordered pitch-class intervals. The ordered one, also called directed interval, may be considered the measure upwards, which, since we are dealing with pitch classes, depends on whichever pitch is chosen as 0. For unordered pitch-class intervals, see interval class.

== Generic and specific intervals ==
In diatonic set theory, specific and generic intervals are distinguished. Specific intervals are the interval class or number of semitones between scale steps or collection members, and generic intervals are the number of diatonic-scale steps (or staff positions) between notes of a collection or scale.

Notice that staff positions, when used to determine the conventional interval number (second, third, fourth, etc.), are counted including the position of the lower note of the interval, while generic interval numbers are counted excluding that position. Thus, generic interval numbers are smaller by 1, with respect to the conventional interval numbers.

=== Comparison ===
Specific interval		Generic interval	Diatonic name
No. of semitones	Interval class	Generic interval	Diatonic name
0	0	0	Perfect unison
1	1	1	Minor second
2	2	1	Major second
3	3	2	Minor third
4	4	2	Major third
5	5	3	Perfect fourth
6	6	3; 4	Augmented fourth Diminished fifth
7	5	4	Perfect fifth
8	4	5	Minor sixth
9	3	5	Major sixth
10	2	6	Minor seventh
11	1	6	Major seventh
12	0	7	Perfect octave

== Generalizations and non-pitch uses ==
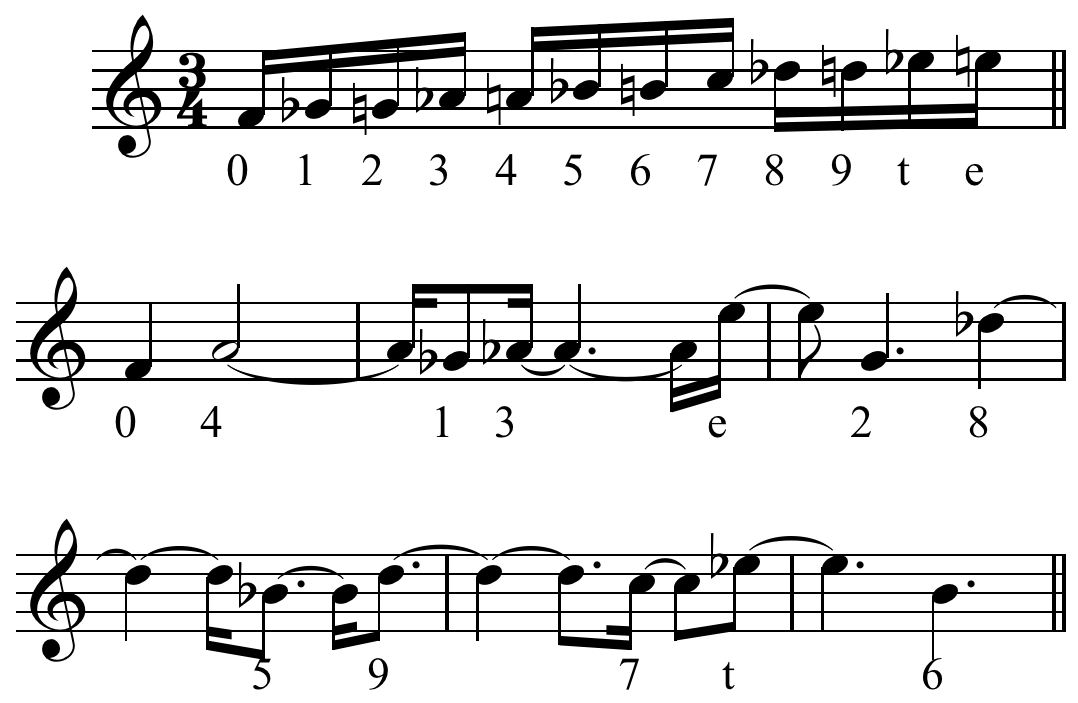
Division of the measure/chromatic scale, followed by pitch/time-point series

The term "interval" can also be generalized to other music elements besides pitch. David Lewin's Generalized Musical Intervals and Transformations uses interval as a generic measure of distance between time points, timbres, or more abstract musical phenomena.

For example, an interval between two bell-like sounds, which have no pitch salience, is still perceptible. When two tones have similar acoustic spectra (sets of partials), the interval is just the distance of the shift of a tone spectrum along the frequency axis, so linking to pitches as reference points is not necessary. The same principle naturally applies to pitched tones (with similar harmonic spectra), which means that intervals can be perceived "directly" without pitch recognition. This explains in particular the predominance of interval recognition over absolute pitch hearing.

== See also ==
- Circle of fifths
- Ear training
- List of meantone intervals
- List of pitch intervals
- Music and mathematics
- Pseudo-octave
- Regular temperament
