= Interval class =

Distance between unordered pitch classes

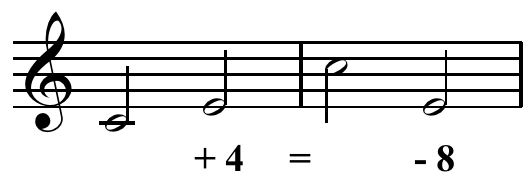
Interval class.

In musical set theory, an interval class (often abbreviated: ic), also known as unordered pitch-class interval, interval distance, undirected interval, or "(even completely incorrectly) as 'interval mod 6'" (Rahn 1980, 29; Whittall 2008, 273–74), is the shortest distance in pitch class space between two unordered pitch classes. For example, the interval class between pitch classes 4 and 9 is 5 because 9 − 4 = 5 is less than 4 − 9 = −5 ≡ 7 (mod 12). See modular arithmetic for more on modulo 12. The largest interval class is 6 since any greater interval n may be reduced to 12 − n.

== Use of interval classes ==
The concept of interval class accounts for octave, enharmonic, and inversional equivalency. Consider, for instance, the following passage:

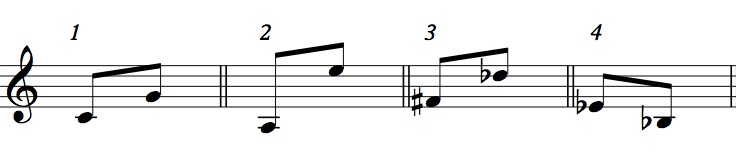

(To hear a MIDI realization, click the following: 106 KB

In the example above, all four labeled pitch-pairs, or dyads, share a common "intervallic color." In atonal theory, this similarity is denoted by interval class—ic 5, in this case. Tonal theory, however, classifies the four intervals differently: interval 1 as perfect fifth; 2, perfect twelfth; 3, diminished sixth; and 4, perfect fourth.

== Notation of interval classes ==
The unordered pitch class interval i(a, b) may be defined as

$$i  (a,b) =\text{ the smaller of }i \langle a,b\rangle\text{ and }i \langle b,a\rangle,$$

where i⟨a, b⟩ is an ordered pitch-class interval (Rahn 1980, 28).

While notating unordered intervals with parentheses, as in the example directly above, is perhaps the standard, some theorists, including Robert Morris, prefer to use braces, as in i{a, b}. Both notations are considered acceptable.

== Table of interval class equivalencies ==
Interval Class Table
ic	included intervals	tonal counterparts	extended intervals
0	0	unison and octave	diminished 2nd and augmented 7th
1	1 and 11	minor 2nd and major 7th	augmented unison and diminished octave
2	2 and 10	major 2nd and minor 7th	diminished 3rd and augmented 6th
3	3 and 9	minor 3rd and major 6th	augmented 2nd and diminished 7th
4	4 and 8	major 3rd and minor 6th	diminished 4th and augmented 5th
5	5 and 7	perfect 4th and perfect 5th	augmented 3rd and diminished 6th
6	6	augmented 4th and diminished 5th	

== See also ==
- Pitch interval
- Similarity relation

== Sources ==
- Morris, Robert (1991). Class Notes for Atonal Music Theory. Hanover, NH: Frog Peak Music.
- Rahn, John (1980). Basic Atonal Theory. ISBN 0-02-873160-3.
- Whittall, Arnold (2008). The Cambridge Introduction to Serialism. New York: Cambridge University Press. ISBN 978-0-521-68200-8 (pbk).
