= List of pitch intervals =

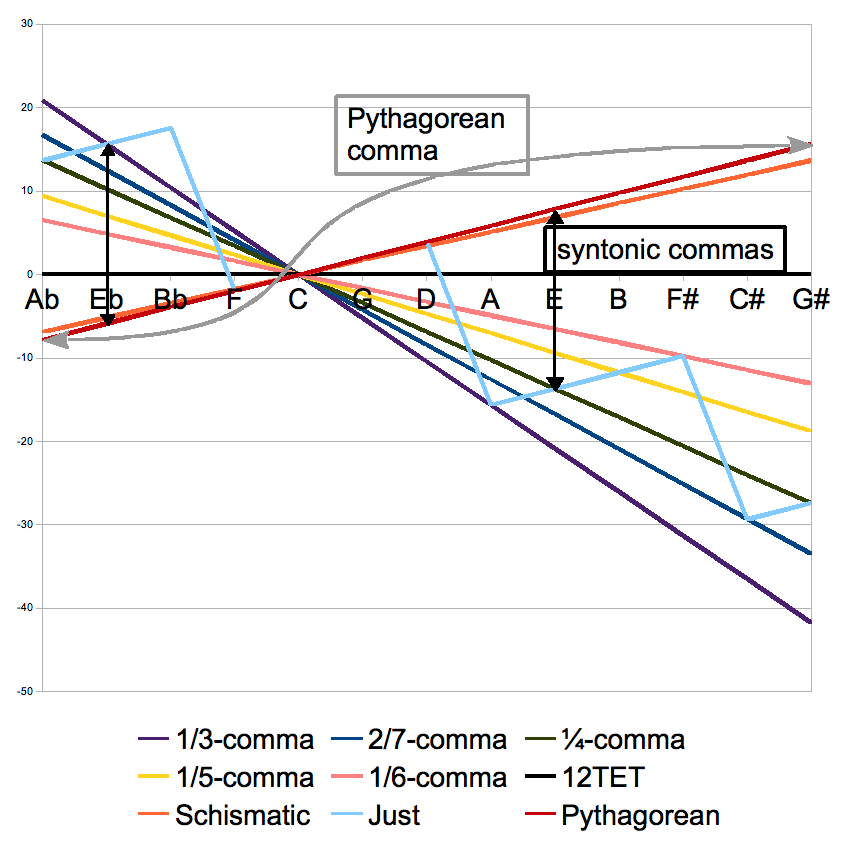
Comparison between tunings: Pythagorean, equal-tempered, quarter-comma meantone, and others. For each, the common origin is arbitrarily chosen as C. The degrees are arranged in the order or the cycle of fifths; as in each of these tunings except just intonation all fifths are of the same size, the tunings appear as straight lines, the slope indicating the relative tempering with respect to Pythagorean, which has pure fifths (3:2, 702 cents). The Pythagorean A♭ (at the left) is at 792 cents, G♯ (at the right) at 816 cents; the difference is the Pythagorean comma. Equal temperament by definition is such that A♭ and G♯ are at the same level. 1/4-comma meantone produces the "just" major third (5:4, 386 cents, a syntonic comma lower than the Pythagorean one of 408 cents). 1/3-comma meantone produces the "just" minor third (6:5, 316 cents, a syntonic comma higher than the Pythagorean one of 294 cents). In both these meantone temperaments, the enharmony, here the difference between A♭ and G♯, is much larger than in Pythagorean, and with the flat degree higher than the sharp one.

Comparison of two sets of musical intervals. The equal-tempered intervals are black; the Pythagorean intervals are green.

Below is a list of intervals expressible in terms of a prime limit (see Terminology), completed by a choice of intervals in various equal subdivisions of the octave or of other intervals.

For commonly encountered harmonic or melodic intervals between pairs of notes in contemporary Western music theory, without consideration of the way in which they are tuned, see Interval (music) § Main intervals.

== Terminology ==
- The prime limit henceforth referred to simply as the limit, is the largest prime number occurring in the factorizations of the numerator and denominator of the frequency ratio describing a rational interval. For instance, the limit of the just perfect fourth (4:3) is 3, but the just minor tone (10:9) has a limit of 5, because 10 can be factored into 2 × 5 (and 9 into 3 × 3). There exists another type of limit, the odd limit, a concept used by Harry Partch (bigger of odd numbers obtained after dividing numerator and denominator by highest possible powers of 2), but it is not used here. The term "limit" was devised by Partch.
- By definition, every interval in a given limit can also be part of a limit of higher order. For instance, a 3-limit unit can also be part of a 5-limit tuning and so on. By sorting the limit columns in the table below, all intervals of a given limit can be brought together (sort backwards by clicking the button twice).
- Pythagorean tuning means 3-limit intonation—a ratio of numbers with prime factors no higher than three.
- Just intonation means 5-limit intonation—a ratio of numbers with prime factors no higher than five.
- Septimal, undecimal, tridecimal, and septendecimal mean, respectively, 7, 11, 13, and 17-limit intonation.
- Meantone refers to meantone temperament, where the whole tone is the mean of the major third. In general, a meantone is constructed in the same way as Pythagorean tuning, as a stack of fifths: the tone is reached after two fifths, the major third after four, so that as all fifths are the same, the tone is the mean of the third. In a meantone temperament, each fifth is narrowed ("tempered") by the same small amount. The most common of meantone temperaments is the quarter-comma meantone, in which each fifth is tempered by 1/4 of the syntonic comma, so that after four steps the major third (as C-G-D-A-E) is a full syntonic comma lower than the Pythagorean one. The extremes of the meantone systems encountered in historical practice are the Pythagorean tuning, where the whole tone corresponds to 9:8, i.e. (3:2)^{2}/2, the mean of the major third (3:2)^{4}/4, and the fifth (3:2) is not tempered; and the 1/3-comma meantone, where the fifth is tempered to the extent that three ascending fifths produce a pure minor third. (See meantone temperaments).
- Equal-tempered refers to X-tone equal temperament with intervals corresponding to X divisions per octave.
- Tempered intervals however cannot be expressed in terms of prime limits and, unless exceptions, are not found in the table below.
- The table can also be sorted by frequency ratio, by cents, or alphabetically.
- Superparticular ratios are intervals that can be expressed as the ratio of two consecutive integers.

== List ==
Column	Legend
TET	X-tone equal temperament (12-tet, etc.).
Limit	3-limit intonation, or Pythagorean.
Limit	5-limit "just" intonation, or just.
Limit	7-limit intonation, or septimal.
Limit	11-limit intonation, or undecimal.
Limit	13-limit intonation, or tridecimal.
Limit	17-limit intonation, or septendecimal.
Limit	19-limit intonation, or novendecimal.
Limit	Higher limits.
M	Meantone temperament or tuning.
S	Superparticular ratio (no separate color code).

List of musical intervals
Cents	Note (from C)	Freq. ratio	Prime factors	Interval name	TET	Limit	M	S
0.00	C	1 : 1	1 : 1	Unison, monophony, perfect prime/first, tonic, or fundamental	1, 12	3	M	
0.03		65537 : 65536	65537 : 2^{16}	Sixty-five-thousand-five-hundred-thirty-seventh harmonic		65537		S
0.40	C♯−	4375 : 4374	5^{4}×7 : 2×3^{7}	Ragisma		7		S
0.72	E+	2401 : 2400	7^{4} : 2^{5}×3×5^{2}	Breedsma		7		S
1.00		2^{1/1200}	2^{1/1200}	Cent	1200			
1.20		2^{1/1000}	2^{1/1000}	Millioctave	1000			
1.95	B♯++	32805 : 32768	3^{8}×5 : 2^{15}	Schisma		5		
1.96		3:2÷(2^{7/12})	3 : 2^{19/12}	Grad, Werckmeister				
3.99		10^{1/1000}	2^{1/1000}×5^{1/1000}	Savart or eptaméride	301.03			
7.71	B♯	225 : 224	3^{2}×5^{2} : 2^{5}×7	Septimal kleisma, marvel comma		7		S
8.11	B−	15625 : 15552	5^{6} : 2^{6}×3^{5}	Kleisma or semicomma majeur		5		
10.06	A++	2109375 : 2097152	3^{3}×5^{7} : 2^{21}	Semicomma, Fokker's comma		5		
10.85	C	160 : 159	2^{5}×5 : 3×53	Difference between 5:3 & 53:32		53		S
11.98	C	145 : 144	5×29 : 2^{4}×3^{2}	Difference between 29:16 & 9:5		29		S
12.50		2^{1/96}	2^{1/96}	Sixteenth tone	96			
13.07	B−	1728 : 1715	2^{6}×3^{3} : 5×7^{3}	Orwell comma		7		
13.47	C	129 : 128	3×43 : 2^{7}	Hundred-twenty-ninth harmonic		43		S
13.79	D	126 : 125	2×3^{2}×7 : 5^{3}	Small septimal semicomma, small septimal comma, starling comma		7		S
14.37	C♭↑↑−	121 : 120	11^{2} : 2^{3}×3×5	Undecimal seconds comma		11		S
16.67	C↑ (Note: Maneri-Sims notation)	2^{1/72}	2^{1/72}	1 step in 72 equal temperament	72			
18.13	C	96 : 95	2^{5}×3 : 5×19	Difference between 19:16 & 6:5		19		S
19.55	D--	2048 : 2025	2^{11} : 3^{4}×5^{2}	Diaschisma, minor comma		5		
21.51	C+	81 : 80	3^{4} : 2^{4}×5	Syntonic comma, major comma, komma, chromatic diesis, or comma of Didymus		5		S
22.64		2^{1/53}	2^{1/53}	Holdrian comma, Holder's comma, 1 step in 53 equal temperament	53			
23.46	B♯+++	531441 : 524288	3^{12} : 2^{19}	Pythagorean comma, ditonic comma, Pythagorean augmented seventh		3		
25.00		2^{1/48}	2^{1/48}	Eighth tone	48			
26.84	C	65 : 64	5×13 : 2^{6}	Sixty-fifth harmonic, 13th-partial chroma		13		S
27.26	C−	64 : 63	2^{6} : 3^{2}×7	Septimal comma, Archytas' comma, 63rd subharmonic		7		S
29.27		2^{1/41}	2^{1/41}	1 step in 41 equal temperament	41			
31.19	D♭↓	56 : 55	2^{3}×7 : 5×11	Undecimal diesis, Ptolemy's enharmonic: difference between (11 : 8) and (7 : 5) tritone		11		S
33.33	C/D♭	2^{1/36}	2^{1/36}	Sixth tone	36, 72			
34.28	C	51 : 50	3×17 : 2×5^{2}	Difference between 17:16 & 25:24		17		S
34.98	B♯-	50 : 49	2×5^{2} : 7^{2}	Septimal sixth tone or jubilisma, Erlich's decatonic comma or tritonic diesis		7		S
35.70	D♭	49 : 48	7^{2} : 2^{4}×3	Septimal diesis, slendro diesis or septimal 1/6-tone		7		S
38.05	C	46 : 45	2×23 : 3^{2}×5	Inferior quarter tone, difference between 23:16 & 45:32		23		S
38.71		2^{1/31}	2^{1/31}	1 step in 31 equal temperament or Normal Diesis	31			
38.91	C↓♯+	45 : 44	3^{2}×5 : 4×11	Undecimal diesis or undecimal fifth tone		11		S
40.00		2^{1/30}	2^{1/30}	Fifth tone	30			
41.06	D−	128 : 125	2^{7} : 5^{3}	Enharmonic diesis or 5-limit limma, minor diesis, diminished second, minor diesis or diesis, 125th subharmonic		5		
41.72	D♭	42 : 41	2×3×7 : 41	Lesser 41-limit fifth tone		41		S
42.75	C	41 : 40	41 : 2^{3}×5	Greater 41-limit fifth tone		41		S
43.83	C♯	40 : 39	2^{3}×5 : 3×13	Tridecimal fifth tone		13		S
44.97	C	39 : 38	3×13 : 2×19	Superior quarter-tone, novendecimal fifth tone		19		S
46.17	D-	38 : 37	2×19 : 37	Lesser 37-limit quarter tone		37		S
47.43	C♯	37 : 36	37 : 2^{2}×3^{2}	Greater 37-limit quarter tone		37		S
48.77	C	36 : 35	2^{2}×3^{2} : 5×7	Septimal quarter tone, septimal diesis, septimal chroma, superior quarter tone		7		S
49.98		246 : 239	3×41 : 239	Just quarter tone		239		
50.00	C/D	2^{1/24}	2^{1/24}	Equal-tempered quarter tone	24			
50.18	D♭	35 : 34	5×7 : 2×17	ET quarter-tone approximation, lesser 17-limit quarter tone		17		S
50.72	B♯++	59049 : 57344	3^{10} : 2^{13}×7	Harrison's comma (10 P5s – 1 H7)		7		
51.68	C↓♯	34 : 33	2×17 : 3×11	Greater 17-limit quarter tone		17		S
53.27	C↑	33 : 32	3×11 : 2^{5}	Thirty-third harmonic, undecimal comma, undecimal quarter tone		11		S
54.96	D♭-	32 : 31	2^{5} : 31	Inferior quarter-tone, thirty-first subharmonic		31		S
56.55	B♯+	529 : 512	23^{2} : 2^{9}	Five-hundred-twenty-ninth harmonic		23		
56.77	C	31 : 30	31 : 2×3×5	Greater quarter-tone, difference between 31:16 & 15:8		31		S
58.69	C♯	30 : 29	2×3×5 : 29	Lesser 29-limit quarter tone		29		S
60.75	C	29 : 28	29 : 2^{2}×7	Greater 29-limit quarter tone		29		S
62.96	D♭-	28 : 27	2^{2}×7 : 3^{3}	Septimal minor second, small minor second, inferior quarter tone		7		S
63.81		(3 : 2)^{1/11}	3^{1/11} : 2^{1/11}	Beta scale step	18.80			
65.34	C♯+	27 : 26	3^{3} : 2×13	Chromatic diesis, tridecimal comma		13		S
66.34	D♭	133 : 128	7×19 : 2^{7}	One-hundred-thirty-third harmonic		19		
66.67	C↑/C♯	2^{1/18}	2^{1/18}	Third tone	18, 36, 72			
67.90	D-	26 : 25	2×13 : 5^{2}	Tridecimal third tone, third tone		13		S
70.67	C♯	25 : 24	5^{2} : 2^{3}×3	Just chromatic semitone or minor chroma, lesser chromatic semitone, small (just) semitone or minor second, minor chromatic semitone, or minor semitone, 2/7-comma meantone chromatic semitone, augmented unison		5		S
73.68	D♭-	24 : 23	2^{3}×3 : 23	Lesser 23-limit semitone		23		S
75.00		2^{1/16}	2^{3/48}	1 step in 16 equal temperament, 3 steps in 48	16, 48			
76.96	C↓♯+	23 : 22	23 : 2×11	Greater 23-limit semitone		23		S
78.00		(3 : 2)^{1/9}	3^{1/9} : 2^{1/9}	Alpha scale step	15.39			
79.31		67 : 64	67 : 2^{6}	Sixty-seventh harmonic		67		
80.54	C↑-	22 : 21	2×11 : 3×7	Hard semitone, two-fifth tone small semitone		11		S
84.47	D♭	21 : 20	3×7 : 2^{2}×5	Septimal chromatic semitone, minor semitone		7		S
88.80	C♯	20 : 19	2^{2}×5 : 19	Novendecimal augmented unison		19		S
90.22	D♭−−	256 : 243	2^{8} : 3^{5}	Pythagorean minor second or limma, Pythagorean diatonic semitone, Low Semitone		3		
92.18	C♯+	135 : 128	3^{3}×5 : 2^{7}	Greater chromatic semitone, chromatic semitone, semitone medius, major chroma or major limma, small limma, major chromatic semitone, limma ascendant		5		
93.60	D♭-	19 : 18	19 : 2×3^{2}	Novendecimal minor second		19		S
97.36	D↓↓	128 : 121	2^{7} : 11^{2}	121st subharmonic, undecimal minor second		11		
98.95	D♭	18 : 17	2×3^{2} : 17	Just minor semitone, Arabic lute index finger		17		S
100.00	C♯/D♭	2^{1/12}	2^{1/12}	Equal-tempered minor second or semitone	12		M	
104.96	C♯	17 : 16	17 : 2^{4}	Minor diatonic semitone, just major semitone, overtone semitone, 17th harmonic, limma		17		S
111.45		^{25}√5	(5 : 1)^{1/25}	Studie II interval (compound just major third, 5:1, divided into 25 equal parts)	10.77			
111.73	D♭-	16 : 15	2^{4} : 3×5	Just minor second, just diatonic semitone, large just semitone or major second, major semitone, limma, minor diatonic semitone, diatonic second semitone, diatonic semitone, 1/6-comma meantone minor second		5		S
113.69	C♯++	2187 : 2048	3^{7} : 2^{11}	Apotome or Pythagorean major semitone, Pythagorean augmented unison, Pythagorean chromatic semitone, or Pythagorean apotome		3		
116.72		(18 : 5)^{1/19}	2^{1/19}×3^{2/19} : 5^{1/19}	Secor	10.28			
119.44	C♯	15 : 14	3×5 : 2×7	Septimal diatonic semitone, major diatonic semitone, Cowell semitone		7		S
125.00		2^{5/48}	2^{5/48}	5 steps in 48 equal temperament	48			
128.30	D	14 : 13	2×7 : 13	Lesser tridecimal 2/3-tone		13		S
130.23	C♯+	69 : 64	3×23 : 2^{6}	Sixty-ninth harmonic		23		
133.24	D♭	27 : 25	3^{3} : 5^{2}	Semitone maximus, minor second, large limma or Bohlen-Pierce small semitone, high semitone, alternate Renaissance half-step, large limma, acute minor second		5		
133.33	C♯/D♭	2^{1/9}	2^{2/18}	Two-third tone	9, 18, 36, 72			
138.57	D♭-	13 : 12	13 : 2^{2}×3	Greater tridecimal 2/3-tone, Three-quarter tone		13		S
150.00	C/D	2^{3/24}	2^{1/8}	Equal-tempered neutral second	8, 24			
150.64	D↓	12 : 11	2^{2}×3 : 11	3/4 tone or Undecimal neutral second, trumpet three-quarter tone, middle finger [between frets]		11		S
155.14	D	35 : 32	5×7 : 2^{5}	Thirty-fifth harmonic		7		
160.90	D−−	800 : 729	2^{5}×5^{2} : 3^{6}	Grave whole tone, neutral second, grave major second		5		
165.00	D↑♭−	11 : 10	11 : 2×5	Greater undecimal minor/major/neutral second, 4/5-tone or Ptolemy's second		11		S
171.43		2^{1/7}	2^{1/7}	1 step in 7 equal temperament	7			
175.00		2^{7/48}	2^{7/48}	7 steps in 48 equal temperament	48			
179.70		71 : 64	71 : 2^{6}	Seventy-first harmonic		71		
180.45	E−−−	65536 : 59049	2^{16} : 3^{10}	Pythagorean diminished third, Pythagorean minor tone		3		
182.40	D−	10 : 9	2×5 : 3^{2}	Small just whole tone or major second, minor whole tone, lesser whole tone, minor tone, minor second, half-comma meantone major second		5		S
200.00	D	2^{2/12}	2^{1/6}	Equal-tempered major second	6, 12		M	
203.91	D	9 : 8	3^{2} : 2^{3}	Pythagorean major second, Large just whole tone or major second (sesquioctavan), tonus, major whole tone, greater whole tone, major tone		3		S
215.89	D	145 : 128	5×29 : 2^{7}	Hundred-forty-fifth harmonic		29		
223.46	E−	256 : 225	2^{8} : 3^{2}×5^{2}	Just diminished third, 225th subharmonic		5		
225.00		2^{3/16}	2^{9/48}	9 steps in 48 equal temperament	16, 48			
227.79		73 : 64	73 : 2^{6}	Seventy-third harmonic		73		
231.17	D−	8 : 7	2^{3} : 7	Septimal major second, septimal whole tone		7		S
240.00		2^{1/5}	2^{1/5}	1 step in 5 equal temperament	5			
247.74	D♯	15 : 13	3×5 : 13	Tridecimal 5/4 tone		13		
250.00	D/E	2^{5/24}	2^{5/24}	5 steps in 24 equal temperament	24			
251.34	D♯	37 : 32	37 : 2^{5}	Thirty-seventh harmonic		37		
253.08	D♯−	125 : 108	5^{3} : 2^{2}×3^{3}	Semi-augmented whole tone, semi-augmented second		5		
262.37	E↓♭	64 : 55	2^{6} : 5×11	55th subharmonic		11		
266.87	E♭	7 : 6	7 : 2×3	Septimal minor third or Sub minor third		7		S
268.80	D	299 : 256	13×23 : 2^{8}	Two-hundred-ninety-ninth harmonic		23		
274.58	D♯	75 : 64	3×5^{2} : 2^{6}	Just augmented second, Augmented tone, augmented second		5		
275.00		2^{11/48}	2^{11/48}	11 steps in 48 equal temperament	48			
289.21	E↓♭	13 : 11	13 : 11	Tridecimal minor third		13		
294.13	E♭−	32 : 27	2^{5} : 3^{3}	Pythagorean minor third semiditone, or 27th subharmonic		3		
297.51	E♭	19 : 16	19 : 2^{4}	19th harmonic, 19-limit minor third, overtone minor third		19		
300.00	D♯/E♭	2^{3/12}	2^{1/4}	Equal-tempered minor third	4, 12		M	
301.85	D♯-	25 : 21	5^{2} : 3×7	Quasi-equal-tempered minor third, 2nd 7-limit minor third, Bohlen-Pierce second		7		
310.26		6:5÷(81:80)^{1/4}	2^{2} : 5^{3/4}	Quarter-comma meantone minor third			M	
311.98		(3 : 2)^{4/9}	3^{4/9} : 2^{4/9}	Alpha scale minor third	15.39			
315.64	E♭	6 : 5	2×3 : 5	Just minor third, minor third, 1/3-comma meantone minor third		5	M	S
317.60	D♯++	19683 : 16384	3^{9} : 2^{14}	Pythagorean augmented second		3		
320.14	E♭↑	77 : 64	7×11 : 2^{6}	Seventy-seventh harmonic		11		
325.00		2^{13/48}	2^{13/48}	13 steps in 48 equal temperament	48			
336.13	D♯-	17 : 14	17 : 2×7	Superminor third		17		
337.15	E♭+	243 : 200	3^{5} : 2^{3}×5^{2}	Acute minor third		5		
342.48	E♭	39 : 32	3×13 : 2^{5}	Thirty-ninth harmonic		13		
342.86		2^{2/7}	2^{2/7}	2 steps in 7 equal temperament	7			
342.91	E♭-	128 : 105	2^{7} : 3×5×7	105th subharmonic, septimal neutral third		7		
347.41	E↑♭−	11 : 9	11 : 3^{2}	Undecimal neutral third		11		
350.00	D/E	2^{7/24}	2^{7/24}	Equal-tempered neutral third	24			
354.55	E↓+	27 : 22	3^{3} : 2×11	Zalzal's wosta 12:11 X 9:8		11		
359.47	E	16 : 13	2^{4} : 13	Tridecimal neutral third		13		
364.54		79 : 64	79 : 2^{6}	Seventy-ninth harmonic		79		
364.81	E−	100 : 81	2^{2}×5^{2} : 3^{4}	Grave major third		5		
375.00		2^{5/16}	2^{15/48}	15 steps in 48 equal temperament	16, 48			
384.36	F♭−−	8192 : 6561	2^{13} : 3^{8}	Pythagorean diminished fourth, Pythagorean 'schismatic' third		3		
386.31	E	5 : 4	5 : 2^{2}	Just major third, major third, quarter-comma meantone major third		5	M	S
397.10	E+	161 : 128	7×23 : 2^{7}	One-hundred-sixty-first harmonic		23		
400.00	E	2^{4/12}	2^{1/3}	Equal-tempered major third	3, 12		M	
402.47	E	323 : 256	17×19 : 2^{8}	Three-hundred-twenty-third harmonic		19		
407.82	E+	81 : 64	3^{4} : 2^{6}	Pythagorean major third, ditone		3		
417.51	F↓+	14 : 11	2×7 : 11	Undecimal diminished fourth or major third		11		
425.00		2^{17/48}	2^{17/48}	17 steps in 48 equal temperament	48			
427.37	F♭	32 : 25	2^{5} : 5^{2}	Just diminished fourth, diminished fourth, 25th subharmonic		5		
429.06	E	41 : 32	41 : 2^{5}	Forty-first harmonic		41		
435.08	E	9 : 7	3^{2} : 7	Septimal major third, Bohlen-Pierce third, Super major Third		7		
444.77	F↓	128 : 99	2^{7} : 3^{2}×11	99th subharmonic		11		
450.00	E/F	2^{9/24}	2^{9/24}	9 steps in 24 equal temperament	8, 24			
450.05		83 : 64	83 : 2^{6}	Eighty-third harmonic		83		
454.21	F♭	13 : 10	13 : 2×5	Tridecimal major third or diminished fourth		13		
456.99	E♯	125 : 96	5^{3} : 2^{5}×3	Just augmented third, augmented third		5		
462.35	E-	64 : 49	2^{6} : 7^{2}	49th subharmonic		7		
470.78	F+	21 : 16	3×7 : 2^{4}	Twenty-first harmonic, narrow fourth, septimal fourth, wide augmented third, H7 on G		7		
475.00		2^{19/48}	2^{19/48}	19 steps in 48 equal temperament	48			
478.49	E♯+	675 : 512	3^{3}×5^{2} : 2^{9}	Six-hundred-seventy-fifth harmonic, wide augmented third		5		
480.00		2^{2/5}	2^{2/5}	2 steps in 5 equal temperament	5			
491.27	E♯	85 : 64	5×17 : 2^{6}	Eighty-fifth harmonic		17		
498.04	F	4 : 3	2^{2} : 3	Perfect fourth, Pythagorean perfect fourth, Just perfect fourth or diatessaron		3		S
500.00	F	2^{5/12}	2^{5/12}	Equal-tempered perfect fourth	12		M	
501.42	F+	171 : 128	3^{2}×19 : 2^{7}	One-hundred-seventy-first harmonic		19		
510.51		(3 : 2)^{8/11}	3^{8/11} : 2^{8/11}	Beta scale perfect fourth	18.80			
511.52	F	43 : 32	43 : 2^{5}	Forty-third harmonic		43		
514.29		2^{3/7}	2^{3/7}	3 steps in 7 equal temperament	7			
519.55	F+	27 : 20	3^{3} : 2^{2}×5	5-limit wolf fourth, acute fourth, imperfect fourth		5		
521.51	E♯+++	177147 : 131072	3^{11} : 2^{17}	Pythagorean augmented third (F+ (pitch))		3		
525.00		2^{7/16}	2^{21/48}	21 steps in 48 equal temperament	16, 48			
531.53	F+	87 : 64	3×29 : 2^{6}	Eighty-seventh harmonic		29		
536.95	F↓♯+	15 : 11	3×5 : 11	Undecimal augmented fourth		11		
550.00	F/G	2^{11/24}	2^{11/24}	11 steps in 24 equal temperament	24			
551.32	F↑	11 : 8	11 : 2^{3}	eleventh harmonic, undecimal tritone, lesser undecimal tritone, undecimal semi-augmented fourth		11		
563.38	F♯+	18 : 13	2×9 : 13	Tridecimal augmented fourth		13		
568.72	F♯	25 : 18	5^{2} : 2×3^{2}	Just augmented fourth		5		
570.88		89 : 64	89 : 2^{6}	Eighty-ninth harmonic		89		
575.00		2^{23/48}	2^{23/48}	23 steps in 48 equal temperament	48			
582.51	G♭	7 : 5	7 : 5	Lesser septimal tritone, septimal tritone Huygens' tritone or Bohlen-Pierce fourth, septimal fifth, septimal diminished fifth		7		
588.27	G♭−−	1024 : 729	2^{10} : 3^{6}	Pythagorean diminished fifth, low Pythagorean tritone		3		
590.22	F♯+	45 : 32	3^{2}×5 : 2^{5}	Just augmented fourth, just tritone, tritone, diatonic tritone, 'augmented' or 'false' fourth, high 5-limit tritone, 1/6-comma meantone augmented fourth		5		
595.03	G♭	361 : 256	19^{2} : 2^{8}	Three-hundred-sixty-first harmonic		19		
600.00	F♯/G♭	2^{6/12}	2^{1/2}=√2	Equal-tempered tritone	2, 12		M	
609.35	G♭	91 : 64	7×13 : 2^{6}	Ninety-first harmonic		13		
609.78	G♭−	64 : 45	2^{6} : 3^{2}×5	Just tritone, 2nd tritone, 'false' fifth, diminished fifth, low 5-limit tritone, 45th subharmonic		5		
611.73	F♯++	729 : 512	3^{6} : 2^{9}	Pythagorean tritone, Pythagorean augmented fourth, high Pythagorean tritone		3		
617.49	F♯	10 : 7	2×5 : 7	Greater septimal tritone, septimal tritone, Euler's tritone		7		
625.00		2^{25/48}	2^{25/48}	25 steps in 48 equal temperament	48			
628.27	F♯+	23 : 16	23 : 2^{4}	Twenty-third harmonic, classic diminished fifth		23		
631.28	G♭	36 : 25	2^{2}×3^{2} : 5^{2}	Just diminished fifth		5		
646.99	F♯+	93 : 64	3×31 : 2^{6}	Ninety-third harmonic		31		
648.68	G↓	16 : 11	2^{4} : 11	Undecimal semi-diminished fifth		11		
650.00	F/G	2^{13/24}	2^{13/24}	13 steps in 24 equal temperament	24			
665.51	G	47 : 32	47 : 2^{5}	Forty-seventh harmonic		47		
675.00		2^{9/16}	2^{27/48}	27 steps in 48 equal temperament	16, 48			
678.49	A−−−	262144 : 177147	2^{18} : 3^{11}	Pythagorean diminished sixth, Pythagorean wolf fifth		3		
680.45	G−	40 : 27	2^{3}×5 : 3^{3}	5-limit wolf fifth, or diminished sixth, grave fifth, imperfect fifth,		5		
683.83	G	95 : 64	5×19 : 2^{6}	Ninety-fifth harmonic		19		
684.82	E++	12167 : 8192	23^{3} : 2^{13}	12167th harmonic		23		
685.71		2^{4/7} : 1		4 steps in 7 equal temperament	7			
691.20		3:2÷(81:80)^{1/2}	2×5^{1/2} : 3	Half-comma meantone perfect fifth			M	
694.79		3:2÷(81:80)^{1/3}	2^{1/3}×5^{1/3} : 3^{1/3}	1/3-comma meantone perfect fifth			M	
695.81		3:2÷(81:80)^{2/7}	2^{1/7}×5^{2/7} : 3^{1/7}	2/7-comma meantone perfect fifth			M	
696.58		3:2÷(81:80)^{1/4}	5^{1/4}	Quarter-comma meantone perfect fifth			M	
697.65		3:2÷(81:80)^{1/5}	3^{1/5}×5^{1/5} : 2^{1/5}	1/5-comma meantone perfect fifth			M	
698.37		3:2÷(81:80)^{1/6}	3^{1/3}×5^{1/6} : 2^{1/3}	1/6-comma meantone perfect fifth			M	
700.00	G	2^{7/12}	2^{7/12}	Equal-tempered perfect fifth	12		M	
701.89		2^{31/53}	2^{31/53}	53-TET perfect fifth	53			
701.96	G	3 : 2	3 : 2	Perfect fifth, Pythagorean perfect fifth, Just perfect fifth or diapente, fifth, Just fifth		3		S
702.44		2^{24/41}	2^{24/41}	41-TET perfect fifth	41			
703.45		2^{17/29}	2^{17/29}	29-TET perfect fifth	29			
719.90		97 : 64	97 : 2^{6}	Ninety-seventh harmonic		97		
720.00		2^{3/5} : 1		3 steps in 5 equal temperament	5			
721.51	A−	1024 : 675	2^{10} : 3^{3}×5^{2}	Narrow diminished sixth		5		
725.00		2^{29/48}	2^{29/48}	29 steps in 48 equal temperament	48			
729.22	G-	32 : 21	2^{4} : 3×7	21st subharmonic, septimal diminished sixth		7		
733.23	F+	391 : 256	17×23 : 2^{8}	Three-hundred-ninety-first harmonic		23		
737.65	A♭+	49 : 32	7×7 : 2^{5}	Forty-ninth harmonic		7		
743.01	A	192 : 125	2^{6}×3 : 5^{3}	Classic diminished sixth		5		
750.00	G/A	2^{15/24}	2^{15/24}	15 steps in 24 equal temperament	8, 24			
755.23	G↑	99 : 64	3^{2}×11 : 2^{6}	Ninety-ninth harmonic		11		
764.92	A♭	14 : 9	2×7 : 3^{2}	Septimal minor sixth		7		
772.63	G♯	25 : 16	5^{2} : 2^{4}	Just augmented fifth		5		
775.00		2^{31/48}	2^{31/48}	31 steps in 48 equal temperament	48			
781.79		π : 2		Wallis product				
782.49	G↑-	11 : 7	11 : 7	Undecimal minor sixth, undecimal augmented fifth, Lucas numbers		11		
789.85		101 : 64	101 : 2^{6}	Hundred-first harmonic		101		
792.18	A♭−	128 : 81	2^{7} : 3^{4}	Pythagorean minor sixth, 81st subharmonic		3		
798.40	A♭+	203 : 128	7×29 : 2^{7}	Two-hundred-third harmonic		29		
800.00	G♯/A♭	2^{8/12}	2^{2/3}	Equal-tempered minor sixth	3, 12		M	
806.91	G♯	51 : 32	3×17 : 2^{5}	Fifty-first harmonic		17		
813.69	A♭	8 : 5	2^{3} : 5	Just minor sixth		5		
815.64	G♯++	6561 : 4096	3^{8} : 2^{12}	Pythagorean augmented fifth, Pythagorean 'schismatic' sixth		3		
823.80		103 : 64	103 : 2^{6}	Hundred-third harmonic		103		
825.00		2^{11/16}	2^{33/48}	33 steps in 48 equal temperament	16, 48			
832.18	G♯+	207 : 128	3^{2}×23 : 2^{7}	Two-hundred-seventh harmonic		23		
833.09		(5^{1/2}+1)/2	φ : 1	Golden ratio (833 cents scale)				
835.19	A♭+	81 : 50	3^{4} : 2×5^{2}	Acute minor sixth		5		
840.53	A♭	13 : 8	13 : 2^{3}	Tridecimal neutral sixth,Fibonacci numbers, overtone sixth, thirteenth harmonic		13		
848.83	A♭↑	209 : 128	11×19 : 2^{7}	Two-hundred-ninth harmonic		19		
850.00	G/A	2^{17/24}	2^{17/24}	Equal-tempered neutral sixth	24			
852.59	A↓+	18 : 11	2×3^{2} : 11	Undecimal neutral sixth, Zalzal's neutral sixth		11		
857.09	A+	105 : 64	3×5×7 : 2^{6}	Hundred-fifth harmonic		7		
857.14		2^{5/7}	2^{5/7}	5 steps in 7 equal temperament	7			
862.85	A−	400 : 243	2^{4}×5^{2} : 3^{5}	Grave major sixth		5		
873.50	A	53 : 32	53 : 2^{5}	Fifty-third harmonic		53		
875.00		2^{35/48}	2^{35/48}	35 steps in 48 equal temperament	48			
879.86	A↓	128 : 77	2^{7} : 7×11	77th subharmonic		11		
882.40	B−−−	32768 : 19683	2^{15} : 3^{9}	Pythagorean diminished seventh		3		
884.36	A	5 : 3	5 : 3	Just major sixth, Bohlen-Pierce sixth, 1/3-comma meantone major sixth		5	M	
889.76		107 : 64	107 : 2^{6}	Hundred-seventh harmonic		107		
892.54	B	6859 : 4096	19^{3} : 2^{12}	6859th harmonic		19		
900.00	A	2^{9/12}	2^{3/4}	Equal-tempered major sixth	4, 12		M	
902.49	A	32 : 19	2^{5} : 19	19th subharmonic		19		
905.87	A+	27 : 16	3^{3} : 2^{4}	Pythagorean major sixth		3		
921.82		109 : 64	109 : 2^{6}	Hundred-ninth harmonic		109		
925.00		2^{37/48}	2^{37/48}	37 steps in 48 equal temperament	48			
925.42	B−	128 : 75	2^{7} : 3×5^{2}	Just diminished seventh, diminished seventh, 75th subharmonic		5		
925.79	A+	437 : 256	19×23 : 2^{8}	Four-hundred-thirty-seventh harmonic		23		
933.13	A	12 : 7	2^{2}×3 : 7	Septimal major sixth		7		
937.63	A↑	55 : 32	5×11 : 2^{5}	Fifty-fifth harmonic		11		
950.00	A/B	2^{19/24}	2^{19/24}	19 steps in 24 equal temperament	24			
953.30	A♯+	111 : 64	3×37 : 2^{6}	Hundred-eleventh harmonic		37		
955.03	A♯	125 : 72	5^{3} : 2^{3}×3^{2}	Just augmented sixth		5		
957.21		(3 : 2)^{15/11}	3^{15/11} : 2^{15/11}	15 steps in Beta scale	18.80			
960.00		2^{4/5}	2^{4/5}	4 steps in 5 equal temperament	5			
968.83	B♭	7 : 4	7 : 2^{2}	Septimal minor seventh, harmonic seventh, augmented sixth		7		
975.00		2^{13/16}	2^{39/48}	39 steps in 48 equal temperament	16, 48			
976.54	A♯+	225 : 128	3^{2}×5^{2} : 2^{7}	Just augmented sixth		5		
984.21		113 : 64	113 : 2^{6}	Hundred-thirteenth harmonic		113		
996.09	B♭−	16 : 9	2^{4} : 3^{2}	Pythagorean minor seventh, Small just minor seventh, lesser minor seventh, just minor seventh, Pythagorean small minor seventh		3		
999.47	B♭	57 : 32	3×19 : 2^{5}	Fifty-seventh harmonic		19		
1000.00	A♯/B♭	2^{10/12}	2^{5/6}	Equal-tempered minor seventh	6, 12		M	
1014.59	A♯+	115 : 64	5×23 : 2^{6}	Hundred-fifteenth harmonic		23		
1017.60	B♭	9 : 5	3^{2} : 5	Greater just minor seventh, large just minor seventh, Bohlen-Pierce seventh		5		
1019.55	A♯+++	59049 : 32768	3^{10} : 2^{15}	Pythagorean augmented sixth		3		
1025.00		2^{41/48}	2^{41/48}	41 steps in 48 equal temperament	48			
1028.57		2^{6/7}	2^{6/7}	6 steps in 7 equal temperament	7			
1029.58	B♭	29 : 16	29 : 2^{4}	Twenty-ninth harmonic, minor seventh		29		
1035.00	B↓	20 : 11	2^{2}×5 : 11	Lesser undecimal neutral seventh, large minor seventh		11		
1039.10	B♭+	729 : 400	3^{6} : 2^{4}×5^{2}	Acute minor seventh		5		
1044.44	B♭	117 : 64	3^{2}×13 : 2^{6}	Hundred-seventeenth harmonic		13		
1044.86	B♭-	64 : 35	2^{6} : 5×7	35th subharmonic, septimal neutral seventh		7		
1049.36	B↑♭−	11 : 6	11 : 2×3	21/4-tone or Undecimal neutral seventh, undecimal 'median' seventh		11		
1050.00	A/B	2^{21/24}	2^{7/8}	Equal-tempered neutral seventh	8, 24			
1059.17		59 : 32	59 : 2^{5}	Fifty-ninth harmonic		59		
1066.76	B−	50 : 27	2×5^{2} : 3^{3}	Grave major seventh		5		
1071.70	B♭-	13 : 7	13 : 7	Tridecimal neutral seventh		13		
1073.78	B	119 : 64	7×17 : 2^{6}	Hundred-nineteenth harmonic		17		
1075.00		2^{43/48}	2^{43/48}	43 steps in 48 equal temperament	48			
1086.31	C′♭−−	4096 : 2187	2^{12} : 3^{7}	Pythagorean diminished octave		3		
1088.27	B	15 : 8	3×5 : 2^{3}	Just major seventh, small just major seventh, 1/6-comma meantone major seventh		5		
1095.04	C♭	32 : 17	2^{5} : 17	17th subharmonic		17		
1100.00	B	2^{11/12}	2^{11/12}	Equal-tempered major seventh	12		M	
1102.64	B↑↑♭-	121 : 64	11^{2} : 2^{6}	Hundred-twenty-first harmonic		11		
1107.82	C′♭−	256 : 135	2^{8} : 3^{3}×5	Octave − major chroma, 135th subharmonic, narrow diminished octave		5		
1109.78	B+	243 : 128	3^{5} : 2^{7}	Pythagorean major seventh		3		
1116.88		61 : 32	61 : 2^{5}	Sixty-first harmonic		61		
1125.00		2^{15/16}	2^{45/48}	45 steps in 48 equal temperament	16, 48			
1129.33	C′♭	48 : 25	2^{4}×3 : 5^{2}	Classic diminished octave, large just major seventh		5		
1131.02	B	123 : 64	3×41 : 2^{6}	Hundred-twenty-third harmonic		41		
1137.04	B	27 : 14	3^{3} : 2×7	Septimal major seventh		7		
1138.04	C♭	247 : 128	13×19 : 2^{7}	Two-hundred-forty-seventh harmonic		19		
1145.04	B	31 : 16	31 : 2^{4}	Thirty-first harmonic, augmented seventh		31		
1146.73	C↓	64 : 33	2^{6} : 3×11	33rd subharmonic		11		
1150.00	B/C	2^{23/24}	2^{23/24}	23 steps in 24 equal temperament	24			
1151.23	C	35 : 18	5×7 : 2×3^{2}	Septimal supermajor seventh, septimal quarter tone inverted		7		
1158.94	B♯	125 : 64	5^{3} : 2^{6}	Just augmented seventh, 125th harmonic		5		
1172.74	C+	63 : 32	3^{2}×7 : 2^{5}	Sixty-third harmonic		7		
1175.00		2^{47/48}	2^{47/48}	47 steps in 48 equal temperament	48			
1178.49	C′−	160 : 81	2^{5}×5 : 3^{4}	Octave − syntonic comma, semi-diminished octave		5		
1179.59	B↑	253 : 128	11×23 : 2^{7}	Two-hundred-fifty-third harmonic		23		
1186.42		127 : 64	127 : 2^{6}	Hundred-twenty-seventh harmonic		127		
1200.00	C′	2 : 1	2 : 1	Octave, perfect eighth or diapason	1, 12	3	M	S

== See also ==
- List of chord progressions
- List of meantone intervals
- List of musical scales and modes
