= Harmonic seventh =

harmonic seventh
- Inverse: Septimal major second

Name
- Other names: septimal minor seventh, subminor seventh, acute diminished just seventh, quarter comma augmented sixth
- Abbreviation: m 7, ^{H}7, _{min}7, ^{acc}_{dim}7, ^{Aug}6

Size
- Semitones: ~9.7
- Interval class: ~2.3
- Just interval: 7:4

Cents
- Just intonation: 968.826

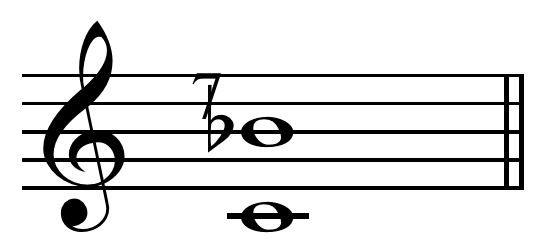
Harmonic seventh, septimal seventh

The harmonic seventh interval (also known as the septimal minor seventh, or subminor seventh) is one with an exact 7:4 ratio (about 969 cents). This is about 31.2 cents narrower, with a more stable and consonant sound, than a minor seventh in 12 equal temperament. It is about 49 cents narrower than and is, "particularly sweet", "sweeter in quality" than an "ordinary" just minor seventh, which has an intonation ratio of 9:5 (about 1018 cents).

The harmonic seventh arises from the harmonic series as the interval between the fourth harmonic (second octave of the fundamental) and the seventh harmonic; in that octave, harmonics 4, 5, 6, and 7 constitute the four notes (in order) of a purely consonant major chord (root position) with an added minor seventh (or augmented sixth, depending on the tuning system used).

== Relation to scale ==
Although the word seventh in the name suggests the seventh note in a scale and the seventh pitch up from the tonic is indeed used to form a harmonic seventh in a few tuning systems, the harmonic seventh is a pitch relation to the tonic, not an ordinal note position in a scale.

As a pitch relation (968.826 cents up from the reference or tonic note) rather than a scale-position note, a harmonic seventh is produced by different notes in different tuning systems:

- In equal temperament, the harmonic seventh is about 32 cents smaller than the equal tempered minor seventh.
- In 5-limit just intonation the harmonic 7th is very near precisely an acute diminished seventh: 7^{￪} . (Note: A just acute diminished seventh is a just seventh (15/ 8 ) flattened twice (first flat is min 7, second flat is dim 7, each just flat lowers the pitch by 70.672 ¢) sharpened by a syntonic comma ("acute") (raises pitch by about 21.506 ¢), hence: 7^{￪} $= \tfrac{ 15 }{\ 8\ } \times \left( \tfrac{\ 24\ }{ 25 }\right)^2 \times \tfrac{\ 81\ }{ 80 } = \tfrac{ 3^7 }{\ 2\times5^4\ } = \frac{ 2187 }{\ 1250\ } ~.$ $\operatorname{cents}\!\left( \tfrac{ 7 }{\ 4\ } \right) \quad = 968.826$ ¢; compare this to $\operatorname{cents}\!\left( \tfrac{ 2187 }{\ 1250\ } \right) = 968.430$ ¢, only 0.396 ¢ flat. Regardless of how accurately it reproduces the interval of a seventh harmonic, a 5-limit justly intoned acute diminished seventh is only a theoretical pitch: The pitch's position in the just tone net is too far separated from its tonic for both to be played together in the same chord without many more notes in the tone network. It is a correctly specified note that does exist among the extended network of just intonation pitches, but the theoretical note cannot be put to practical use: An acute diminished seventh cannot be reached from its tonic in any feasible justly intoned octave made up of only 12 notes.)
- In multiple slight variations of quarter comma meantone, the harmonic seventh is accurately rendered by the augmented sixth interval (rather than a seventh). (Note: A small modification of meantone – the fifth about one seventh of a comma flat, slightly sharper than exactly one quarter of a comma flat – adjusts the tuning to exactly reproduce the seventh harmonic as an augmented sixth: The adjusted quarter comma uses a fifth that is $\ \left( 56 \right)^{1/10}\ ,$ about 696.883 ¢ instead of $\ \left( 5 \right)^{1/4}\ ,$ or about 696.578 ¢, used for conventional quarter comma meantone (which produces pure major thirds by letting fifths fall a quarter-comma flat).)
- In 31 tone equal temperament, the harmonic seventh is quite accurately rendered as 25 steps out of 31 that make up the octave, (Note: $\ 2^{25/31} \approx 1.749 \approx \tfrac{ 7 }{\ 4\ }$ which is 967.742 cents so only 1.084 ¢ flat) while several other just intervals are as relatively well approximated as they are in quarter comma meantone.

== In musical practice ==
When played on the natural horn, the note is often adjusted to 16:9 of the root as a compromise (for C maj^{7♭}, the substituted note is B♭-, 996.09 cents), but some pieces call for the pure harmonic seventh, including Britten's Serenade for Tenor, Horn and Strings.

Use of the seventh harmonic in the prologue to Britten's Serenade for Tenor, Horn and Strings

Composer Ben Johnston uses a small "7" as an accidental to indicate a note is lowered 49 cents (1018 − 969 = 49) (or 32 cents lowered compared to equal temperament, or an upside-down "7" to indicate a note is raised 49 cents (or raised 32 cents compared to equal temperament. Thus, in C major, the seventh partial, or harmonic seventh, is notated as ♭ note with "7" written above the flat.

The harmonic seventh is also expected from barbershop quartet singers, when they tune dominant seventh chords (harmonic seventh chord), and is considered an essential aspect of the barbershop style. (Note: Hagerman & Sundberg (1980) present empirical data that challenges the accuracy of the claim.)

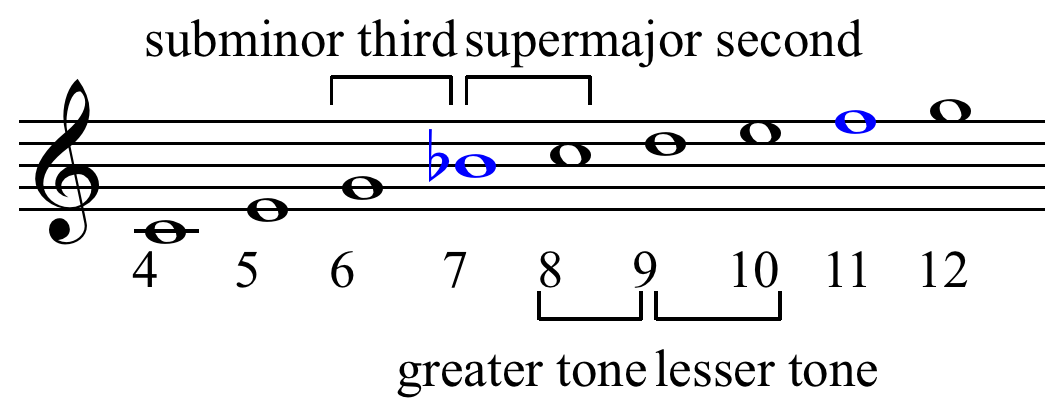
Origin of large and small seconds and thirds in harmonic series.

In quarter-comma meantone tuning, standard in the Baroque and earlier, the augmented sixth is 965.78 cents – only 3 cents below 7:4, well within normal tuning error and vibrato. Pipe organs were the last fixed-tuning instrument to adopt equal temperament. With the transition of organ tuning from meantone to equal-temperament in the late 19th and early 20th centuries the formerly harmonic G_{maj}^{7♭} and B^{♭}_{maj}^{7♭} became "lost chords" (among other chords).

The harmonic seventh differs from the just 5-limit augmented sixth of 225/ 128 by a septimal kleisma (225/ 224 , 7.71 cents), or about 1/ 3 Pythagorean comma. The harmonic seventh note is about 1/ 3 semitone ( ≈ 31 cents ) flatter than an equal-tempered minor seventh. When this flatter seventh is used, the dominant seventh chord's "need to resolve" down a fifth is weak or non-existent. This chord is often used on the tonic (written as I^{7}) and functions as a "fully resolved" final chord.

The twenty-first harmonic (470.78 cents) is the harmonic seventh of the dominant, and would then arise in chains of secondary dominants (known as the Ragtime progression) in styles using harmonic sevenths, such as barbershop music.

== See also ==
- augmented sixth
- quarter comma meantone
- 31 tone equal temperament
