= Minor third =

Musical interval encompassing three half steps

- Inverse: Major sixth

Name
- Other names: Sesquitone
- Abbreviation: m3

Tuning
- 12 equal temperament: 3 semitones (300 cents)
- Pythagorean tuning: 32:27 (294 cents)
- 5-limit tuning: 6:5 (316 cents)
- 7-limit tuning: 7:6 (267 cents)
- 13-limit tuning: 13:11 (289 cents)
- 19-limit tuning: 19:16 (298 cents)

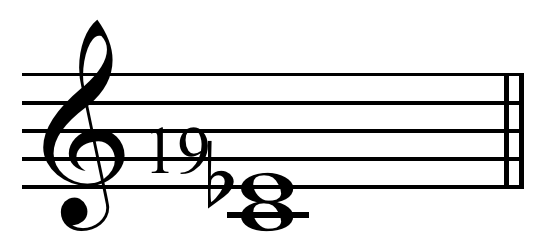
19th harmonic (19:16), E^{19}♭

In music theory, a minor third is a musical interval that encompasses three half steps, or semitones. Staff notation represents the minor third as encompassing three staff positions (see: interval number). The minor third is one of two commonly occurring thirds. It is called minor because it is the smaller of the two: the major third spans an additional semitone. For example, the interval from A to C is a minor third, as the note C lies three semitones above A.

Diminished and augmented thirds span the same number of staff positions, but consist of a different number of semitones (two and five). The minor third is a skip melodically.

The minor third is classed as an imperfect consonance and is considered one of the most consonant intervals after the unison, octave, perfect fifth, and perfect fourth. It may be derived from the harmonic series as the interval between the fifth and sixth harmonics, or from the 19th harmonic.

The minor third is commonly used to express sadness in music, and research shows that this mirrors its use in speech, as a tone similar to a minor third is produced during sad speech. It is also a quartal (based on an ascendance of one or more perfect fourths) tertian interval, as opposed to the major third's quintality. The minor third is also obtainable in reference to a fundamental note from the undertone series, while the major third is obtainable as such from the overtone series. (See Otonality and Utonality.)

The minor scale is so named because of the presence of this interval between its tonic and mediant (1st and 3rd) scale degrees. Minor chords too take their name from the presence of this interval built on the chord's root (provided that the interval of a perfect fifth from the root is also present or implied).

The sopranino saxophone and E♭ clarinet sound in the concert pitch (C) a minor third higher than the written pitch; therefore, to get the sounding pitch one must transpose the written pitch up a minor third. Instruments in A – most commonly the A clarinet, sound a minor third lower than the written pitch.

== In other tunings ==
Equal tempered

Just

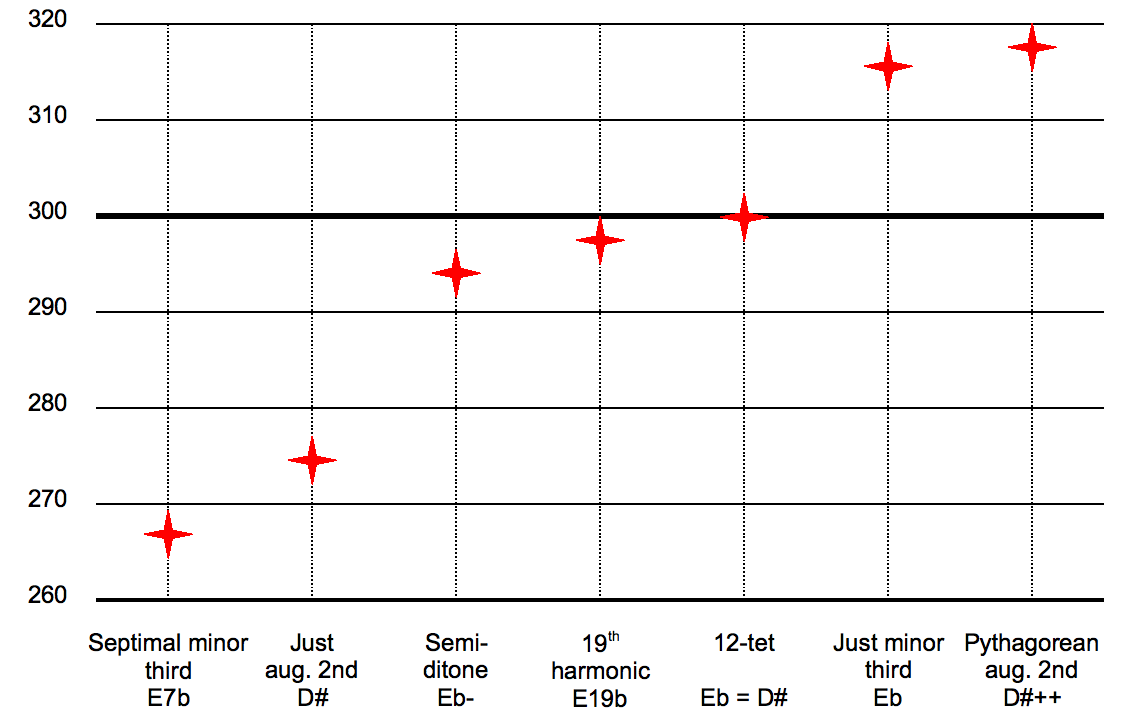
Comparison, in cents, of intervals at or near a minor third

A minor third, in just intonation, corresponds to a pitch ratio of 6:5 or 315.64 cents. In an equal tempered tuning, a minor third is equal to three semitones, a ratio of 2^{1/4}:1 (about 1.189), or 300 cents, 15.64 cents narrower than the 6:5 ratio. In other meantone tunings it is wider, and in 19 equal temperament it is very nearly the 6:5 ratio of just intonation; in more complex schismatic temperaments, such as 53 equal temperament, the "minor third" is often significantly flat (being close to Pythagorean tuning), although the "augmented second" produced by such scales is often within ten cents of a pure 6:5 ratio. If a minor third is tuned in accordance with the fundamental of the overtone series, the result is a ratio of 19:16 or 297.51 cents (the nineteenth harmonic).

The 12-TET minor third (300 cents) more closely approximates the nineteenth harmonic with only 2.49 cents error. M. Ergo mistakenly claimed that the nineteenth harmonic was the highest ever written, for the bass-trumpet in Richard Wagner's Der Ring des Nibelungen (1848–74), when Robert Schumann's Op. 86 Konzertstück for 4 Horns and Orchestra (1849) features the twentieth harmonic (four octaves and a major third above the fundamental) in the first horn part three times.

Other pitch ratios are given related names, the septimal minor third with ratio 7:6 and the tridecimal minor third with ratio 13:11 in particular.

=== Pythagorean minor third ===
In music theory, a semiditone (or Pythagorean minor third) is the interval 32:27 (approximately 294.13 cents). It is the minor third in Pythagorean tuning. It arises in Ptolemy's intense diatonic scale between the 2nd and 4th degrees (in the C major scale, between D and F).

It can be thought of as two octaves minus three justly tuned fifths. It is narrower than a justly tuned minor third by a syntonic comma. Its inversion is a Pythagorean major sixth.

== See also ==
- Musical tuning
- List of meantone intervals
- Pythagorean interval
