= Major seventh =

Musical interval

- Inverse: Minor second

Name
- Abbreviation: M7

Tuning
- 12 equal temperament: 11 semitones (1100 cents)
- Pythagorean tuning: 243:128 (~1109.78 cents)
- 5-limit tuning: 15:8 (~1088.27 cents)

In music from Western culture, a seventh is a musical interval encompassing seven staff positions (see Interval number for more details), and the major seventh is one of two commonly occurring sevenths. It is qualified as major because it is the larger of the two. The major seventh spans eleven semitones, its smaller counterpart being the minor seventh, spanning ten semitones. For example, the interval from C to B is a major seventh, as the note B lies eleven semitones above C, and there are seven staff positions from C to B.

Diminished and augmented sevenths span the same number of staff positions, but consist of a different number of semitones (nine and twelve).

The intervals from the tonic (keynote) in an upward direction to the second, to the third, to the sixth, and to the seventh scale degrees (of a major scale) are called major.

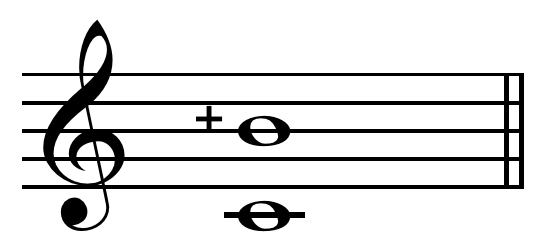
Pythagorean major seventh (243:128) on C, five Pythagorean perfect fifths.

Major seventh (equal temperament)
The file plays middle C, followed by B (a tone 1100 cents sharper than C), followed by both tones together.

A major seventh in just intonation most often corresponds to a pitch ratio of 15:8; in 12-tone equal temperament, a major seventh is equal to eleven semitones, or 1100 cents, about 12 cents wider than the 15:8 major seventh. In 24-tone equal temperament a supermajor seventh, semiaugmented seventh or, semidiminished octave, 23 quarter-tones, is 1150 cents. The small major seventh is a ratio of 9:5, now identified as a just minor seventh. 35:18, or 1151.23 cents, is the ratio of the septimal semi-diminished octave. The 15:8 just major seventh occurs arises in the extended C major scale between C & B and F & E.

Under equal temperament, this interval is enharmonically equivalent to a diminished octave (which has a similar musical use to the augmented unison).

== Examples ==
The major seventh is considered one of the most dissonant intervals after its inversion, the minor second. For this reason, its melodic use is infrequent in classical music. However, in the genial Gavotte from J.S. Bach’s Partita in E major for solo violin, a major seventh features both as a chord (bar 1) and as a melodic interval (bar 5):

J.S Bach's Gavotte from Partita No. 3 for Violin

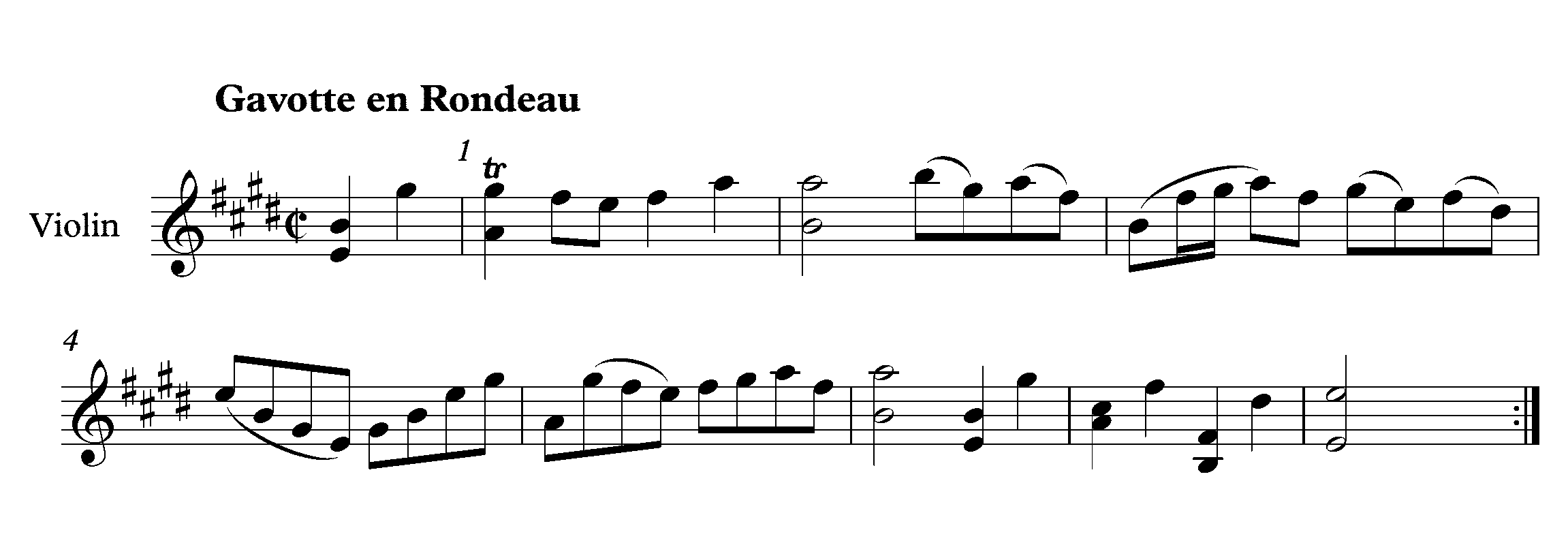
J.S Bach's Gavotte from Partita No. 3 for Violin.

Another piece that makes more dramatic use of the major seventh is "The Hut on Fowl's Legs" from Mussorgsky's piano suite Pictures at an Exhibition (1874).

Mussorgsky, 'The Hut on Fowl's Legs', piano version

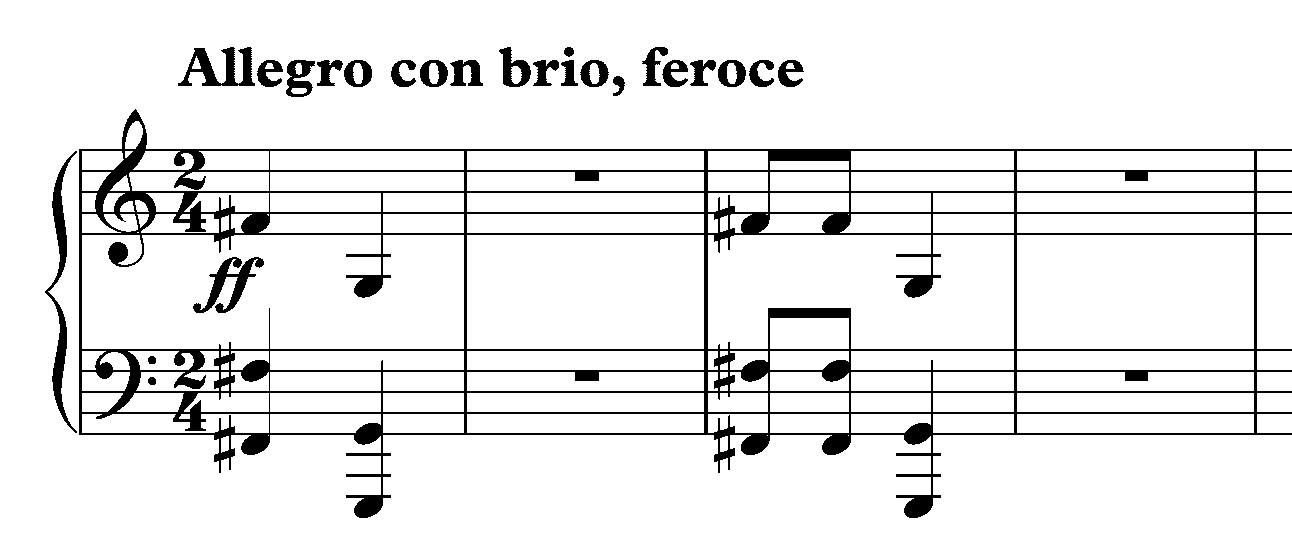
Mussorgsky's "The Hut on Fowl's Legs", piano version.

Another is the closing duet from Verdi's Aida, "O terra addio". During the early 20th century, the major seventh was used increasingly both as a melodic and a harmonic interval, particularly by composers of the Second Viennese School. Anton Webern's Variations for Piano, Op. 27 opens with a major seventh and the interval recurs frequently throughout the piece.

The major seventh occurs most commonly built on the root of major triads, resulting in the chord type also known as major seventh chord or major-major seventh chord: including I^{7} and IV^{7} in major. "Major seven chords add jazziness to a musical passage. Alone, a major seventh interval can sound ugly."

The easiest way to locate and identify the major seventh is from the octave rather than the unison, and it is suggested that one sings the octave first. For example, the most commonly cited example of a melody featuring a major seventh is the tonic-octave-major seventh of the opening to "(Somewhere) Over the Rainbow". "Not many songwriters begin a melody with a major seventh interval; perhaps that's why there are few memorable examples."

== See also ==
- List of meantone intervals
- Leading tone
- Major seventh chord
- Minor seventh
- Musical tuning
