= Diminished third =

diminished third
- Inverse: augmented sixth

Name
- Other names: -
- Abbreviation: d3

Size
- Semitones: 2
- Interval class: 2
- Just interval: 144:125, 256:225, 65536:59049

Cents
- Equal temperament: 200
- Just intonation: 245, 223, 180

In classical music from Western culture, a diminished third is the musical interval produced by narrowing a minor third by a chromatic semitone. For instance, the interval from A to C is a minor third, three semitones wide, and both the intervals from A♯ to C, and from A to C♭ are diminished thirds, two semitones wide.

Being diminished, it is considered a dissonant interval.

== In other tunings ==
n 12-tone equal temperament a diminished third is enharmonic with the major second, both having a value of 200 cents. However, in meantone tunings with fifths flatter than 700 cents, the diminished third is wider than the major second. In 19 equal temperament it is in fact enharmonically equal to an augmented second, both having a value of 252.6 cents. In 31 equal temperament it has a more typical value of 232.3 cents. In a twelve-note keyboard tuned in a meantone tuning from E♭ to G♯, the dimininished third appears between C♯ and E♭, and again between G♯ and B♭. 45 equal temperament has the notable quality that its diminished 3rd is exactly 2 steps of 9edo, which is a fraction of a cent from a pure 7:6.

In superpythagorean tunings, the diminished third is narrower than the major second. In the special case of 17 equal temperament, the chromatic semitone and diminished third are in fact represented by the same interval of 141.18 cents, which allows the minor third to be evenly divided in half. In 22 equal temperament, the diminished third is ~ 109 cents while the chromatic semitone is ~ 163 cents and the diatonic semitone is ~ 55 cents.

In septimal meantone temperament the diminished third is considered to approximate the interval of a septimal major second, with ratio 8/7, and in any meantone tuning in the vicinity of quarter-comma meantone, such as 31-equal temperament, it will come close to that value; for instance in 31-equal temperament the diminished third is a cent sharp of 8/7.

The complementary interval to the diminished third is the augmented sixth, and the numerous chords of common practice music described as augmented sixth chords thereby contain the diminished third as well. For example, a German sixth chord E♭-G-B♭-C♯-E♭' exhibits a diminished third between C♯ and E♭' which complements the augmented sixth between E♭ and C♯.

The just diminished third arises in the extended C major scale between F♯ and A♭, and between B and D♭.

== See also ==
- List of meantone intervals
