= Augmented sixth =

augmented sixth
- Inverse: diminished third

Name
- Abbreviation: A6, ^{A}6

Size
- Semitones: 10
- Interval class: 2
- Just interval: 125:72, 225:128, 7:4, 59049:32768

Cents
- Equal temperament: 1000
- Just intonation: 955, 977, 969, 1020

In music, an augmented sixth, ^{A}6, is an interval produced by widening a major sixth by a chromatic semitone. For instance, the interval from C to A is a major sixth, nine semitones wide in 12 tet, and both the intervals from C♭ to A, and from C to A♯ are augmented sixths, spanning ten semitones (in 12 tet).

Being augmented, it is nominally considered a dissonant interval, even though it renders a perceptibly consonant harmonic seventh in some tuning systems:

In septimal meantone temperament, an augmented sixth is specifically assigned to the harmonic seventh (a consonant just interval of 7:4) and very nearly so in quarter comma meantone and 31 tet. In 12 tet, the augmented sixth is equal to ten semitones, and is both nominally and audibly dissonant.

An augmented sixth (^{A}6) is enharmonically equivalent to a minor seventh (m7). An inverted ^{A}6 is a diminished third.

== Description ==
The augmented sixth is relatively rare. Its most common occurrence is built on the lowered submediant of the prevailing key, in which position the interval assumes a natural tendency to resolve by expanding to an octave built on the dominant tonal degree. In its most common and expected resolution, the lower note of the interval moves downwards by a minor second to the dominant while the upper note, being chromatically inflected, is heard as the leading note of the dominant key, naturally tending to rise by a minor second. It is the strong tendency to resolve in this way that properly identifies an interval as functioning harmonically as an augmented sixth rather than a minor seventh, its more common enharmonic equivalent: The minor seventh has a contrary tendency to resolve to a lower pitch.

As the augmented sixth is correctly named only in certain specific contexts, and the notational distinction between ^{A}6 and the minor seventh (m7) is often ignored. Regardless of the true diatonic context, and despite the augmented sixth being harmonically consonant in several tuning systems, many composers and annotators to the contrary favor the more familiar but dissonant minor seventh – especially in chord notation, which is biased towards rendering chords as chains of major and / or minor thirds, in which chords containing a nominal ^{A}6 are conventionally written as the near-equivalent flattened seventh chords.

The augmented sixth interval in combination with certain other intervals forms the group of chords known collectively as augmented sixth chords.

The just augmented sixth arises in the extended C major scale between A^{♭} and F^{♯}.

== See also ==
- Augmented sixth chord
- List of meantone intervals
