= Pythagorean tuning =

Method of tuning a musical instrument

The syntonic tuning continuum, showing Pythagorean tuning at 702 cents.

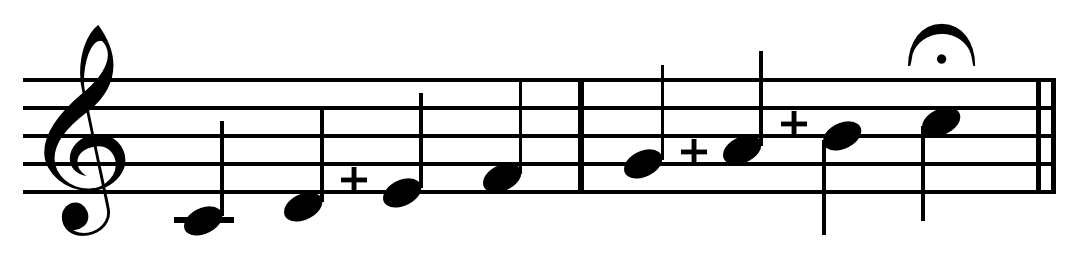
A series of fifths generated can give seven notes: a diatonic major scale on C in Pythagorean tuning.

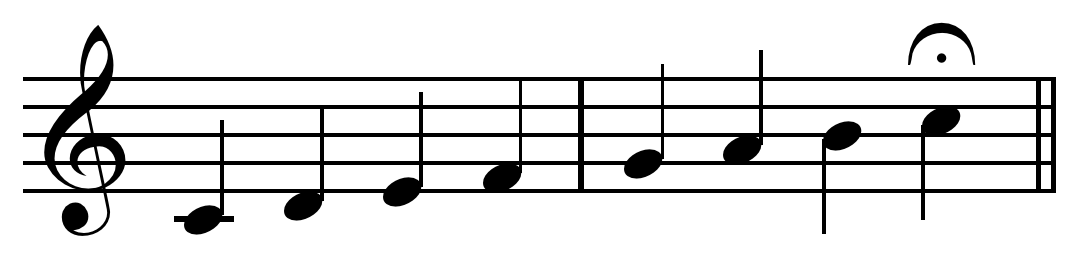
Diatonic scale on C 12-tone equal tempered and just intonation.

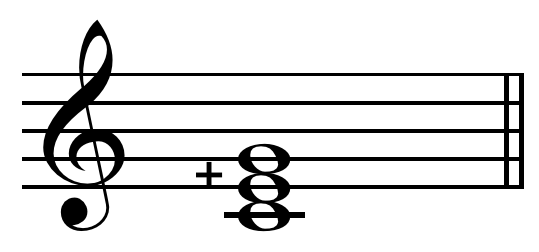
Pythagorean (tonic) major chord on C (compare equal tempered and just).

Comparison of equal-tempered (black) and Pythagorean (green) intervals showing the relationship between frequency ratio and the intervals' values, in cents.

Pythagorean tuning is a system of musical tuning in which the frequency ratios of all intervals are determined by choosing a sequence of fifths which are "pure" or perfect, with ratio $3:2$. This is chosen because it is the next harmonic of a vibrating string, after the octave (which is the ratio $2:1$), and hence is the next most consonant "pure" interval, and the easiest to tune by ear. As Novalis put it, "The musical proportions seem to me to be particularly correct natural proportions." Alternatively, it can be described as the tuning of the syntonic temperament in which the generator is the ratio 3:2 (i.e., the untempered perfect fifth), which is ≈ 702 cents wide.

The system dates back to Ancient Mesopotamia;. (See Music of Mesopotamia § Music theory.) It is named, and has been widely misattributed, to Ancient Greeks, notably Pythagoras (sixth century BC) by modern authors of music theory. Ptolemy, and later Boethius, ascribed the division of the tetrachord by only two intervals, called "semitonium" and "tonus" in Latin (256:243 × 9:8 × 9:8), to Eratosthenes. The so-called "Pythagorean tuning" was used by musicians up to the beginning of the 16th century. "The Pythagorean system would appear to be ideal because of the purity of the fifths, but some consider other intervals, particularly the major third, to be so badly out of tune that major chords [may be considered] a dissonance."

The Pythagorean scale is any scale which can be constructed from only pure perfect fifths (3:2) and octaves (2:1). In Greek music it was used to tune tetrachords, which were composed into scales spanning an octave. A distinction can be made between extended Pythagorean tuning and a 12-tone Pythagorean temperament. Extended Pythagorean tuning corresponds 1-on-1 with western music notation and there is no limit to the number of fifths. In 12-tone Pythagorean temperament however one is limited by 12-tones per octave and one cannot play most music according to the Pythagorean system corresponding to the enharmonic notation. Instead one finds that for instance the diminished sixth becomes a "wolf fifth".

== Method ==
12-tone Pythagorean temperament is based on a sequence of perfect fifths, each tuned in the ratio 3:2, the next simplest ratio after 2:1 (the octave). Starting from D for example (D-based tuning), six other notes are produced by moving six times a ratio 3:2 up, and the remaining ones by moving the same ratio down:

E♭–B♭–F–C–G–D–A–E–B–F♯–C♯–G♯

This succession of eleven 3:2 intervals spans across a wide range of frequency (on a piano keyboard, it encompasses 77 keys). Since notes differing in frequency by a factor of 2 are perceived as similar and given the same name (octave equivalence), it is customary to divide or multiply the frequencies of some of these notes by 2 or by a power of 2. The purpose of this adjustment is to move the 12 notes within a smaller range of frequency, namely within the interval between the base note D and the D above it (a note with twice its frequency). This interval is typically called the basic octave (on a piano keyboard, an octave has only 12 keys). This dates to antiquity: in Ancient Mesopotamia, rather than stacking fifths, tuning was based on alternating ascending fifths and descending fourths (equal to an ascending fifth followed by a descending octave), resulting in the notes of a pentatonic or heptatonic scale falling within an octave.

Note	Interval from D	Formula	=	=	Frequency ratio	Size (cents)	12-TET-dif (cents)
D	unison	$\frac{1}{1}$	$3^{0} \times 2^{0}$	$\frac{3^0}{2^0}$	$\frac{1}{1}$	0.00	0.00
E♭	minor second	$\left( \frac{2}{3} \right)^5 \times 2^3$	$3^{-5} \times 2^{8}$	$\frac{2^8}{3^5}$	$\frac{256}{243}$	90.22	−9.78
E	major second	$\left( \frac{3}{2} \right)^2 \times \frac{1}{2}$	$3^{2} \times 2^{-3}$	$\frac{3^2}{2^3}$	$\frac{9}{8}$	203.91	3.91
F	minor third	$\left( \frac{2}{3} \right)^3 \times 2^2$	$3^{-3} \times 2^{5}$	$\frac{2^5}{3^3}$	$\frac{32}{27}$	294.13	−5.87
F♯	major third	$\left( \frac{3}{2} \right)^4 \times \left( \frac{1}{2} \right)^2$	$3^{4} \times 2^{-6}$	$\frac{3^4}{2^6}$	$\frac{81}{64}$	407.82	7.82
G	perfect fourth	$\frac{2}{3} \times 2$	$3^{-1} \times 2^{2}$	$\frac{2^2}{3^1}$	$\frac{4}{3}$	498.04	−1.96
A♭	diminished fifth	$\left( \frac{2}{3} \right)^6 \times 2^4$	$3^{-6} \times 2^{10}$	$\frac{2^{10}}{3^6}$	$\frac{1024}{729}$	588.27	−11.73
G♯	augmented fourth	$\left( \frac{3}{2} \right)^6 \times \left( \frac{1}{2} \right)^3$	$3^{6} \times 2^{-9}$	$\frac{3^6}{2^9}$	$\frac{729}{512}$	611.73	11.73
A	perfect fifth	$\frac{3}{2}$	$3^{1} \times 2^{-1}$	$\frac{3^1}{2^1}$	$\frac{3}{2}$	701.96	1.96
B♭	minor sixth	$\left( \frac{2}{3} \right)^4 \times 2^3$	$3^{-4} \times 2^{7}$	$\frac{2^7}{3^4}$	$\frac{128}{81}$	792.18	−7.82
B	major sixth	$\left( \frac{3}{2} \right)^3 \times \frac{1}{2}$	$3^{3} \times 2^{-4}$	$\frac{3^3}{2^4}$	$\frac{27}{16}$	905.87	5.87
C	minor seventh	$\left( \frac{2}{3} \right)^2 \times 2^2$	$3^{-2} \times 2^{4}$	$\frac{2^4}{3^2}$	$\frac{16}{9}$	996.09	−3.91
C♯	major seventh	$\left( \frac{3}{2} \right)^5 \times \left( \frac{1}{2} \right)^2$	$3^{5} \times 2^{-7}$	$\frac{3^5}{2^7}$	$\frac{243}{128}$	1109.78	9.78
D	octave	$\frac{2}{1}$	$3^{0} \times 2^{1}$	$\frac{2^1}{3^0}$	$\frac{2}{1}$	1200.00	0.00

In the formulas, the ratios 3:2 or 2:3 represent an ascending or descending perfect fifth (i.e. an increase or decrease in frequency by a perfect fifth, while 2:1 or 1:2 represent a rising or lowering octave). The formulas can also be expressed in terms of powers of the third and the second harmonics.

The major scale based on C, obtained from this tuning is:

Note	C	D	E	F	G	A	B		C
Ratio	1/1	9/8	81/64	4/3	3/2	27/16	243/128		2/1
Step	—	9/8	9/8	256/243	9/8	9/8	9/8	256/243	—

In equal temperament, pairs of enharmonic notes such as A♭ and G♯ are thought of as being exactly the same note—however, as the above table indicates, in Pythagorean tuning they have different ratios with respect to D, which means they are at a different frequency. This discrepancy, of about 23.46 cents, or nearly one quarter of a semitone, is known as a Pythagorean comma.

To get around this problem, Pythagorean tuning constructs only twelve notes as above, with eleven fifths between them. For example, one may use only the 12 notes from E♭ to G♯. This, as shown above, implies that only eleven just fifths are used to build the entire chromatic scale. The remaining interval (the diminished sixth from G♯ to E♭) is left badly out-of-tune, meaning that any music which combines those two notes is unplayable in this tuning. A very out-of-tune interval such as this one is known as a wolf interval. In the case of Pythagorean tuning, all the fifths are 701.96 cents wide, in the exact ratio 3:2, except the wolf fifth, which is only 678.49 cents wide, nearly a quarter of a semitone flatter.

If the notes G♯ and E♭ need to be sounded together, the position of the wolf fifth can be changed. For example, a C-based Pythagorean tuning would produce a stack of fifths running from D♭ to F♯, making F♯-D♭ the wolf interval. However, there will always be one wolf fifth in Pythagorean tuning, making it impossible to play in all keys in tune.

== Sizes of intervals ==
The 144 intervals in C-based Pythagorean tuning.

The tables above only show the frequency ratios of each note with respect to the base note. However, intervals can start from any note and so twelve intervals can be defined for each interval type – twelve unisons, twelve semitones, twelve 2-semitone intervals, etc.

As explained above, one of the twelve fifths (the wolf fifth) has a different size with respect to the other eleven. For a similar reason, each interval type except unisons and octaves has two different sizes. The table on the right shows their frequency ratios, with deviations of a Pythagorean comma coloured. The deviations arise because the notes determine two different semitones:

- The minor second (m2), also called diatonic semitone, with size
  $$S_1 = {2^8 \over 3^5} = {256 \over 243} \approx 90.225 \text{ cents}$$
  (e.g. between D and E♭)
- The augmented unison (A1), also called chromatic semitone, with size
  $$S_2 =  {3^7 \over 2^{11}} = {2187 \over 2048} \approx 113.685 \text{ cents}$$
  (e.g. between E♭ and E)

By contrast, in an equally tempered chromatic scale, all semitones measure

$$S_E=\sqrt[12]2=100.000\text{ cents}$$

and intervals of any given type have the same size, but none are justly tuned except unisons and octaves.

By definition, in Pythagorean tuning 11 perfect fifths (P5 in the table) have a size of approximately 701.955 cents (700+ε cents, where ε ≈ 1.955 cents). Since the average size of the 12 fifths must equal exactly 700 cents (as in equal temperament), the other one must have a size of 700 − 11ε cents, which is about 678.495 cents (the wolf fifth). As shown in the table, the latter interval, although enharmonically equivalent to a fifth, is more properly called a diminished sixth (d6). Similarly,

- 9 minor thirds (m3) are ≈ 294.135 cents (300 − 3ε), 3 augmented seconds (A2) are ≈ 317.595 cents (300 + 9ε), and their average is 300 cents;
- 8 major thirds (M3) are ≈ 407.820 cents (400 + 4ε), 4 diminished fourths (d4) are ≈ 384.360 cents (400 − 8ε), and their average is 400 cents;
- 7 diatonic semitones (m2) are ≈ 90.225 cents (100 − 5ε), 5 chromatic semitones (A1) are ≈ 113.685 cents (100 + 7ε), and their average is 100 cents.

In short, similar differences in width are observed for all interval types, except for unisons and octaves, and they are all multiples of ε, the difference between the Pythagorean fifth and the average fifth.

As an obvious consequence, each augmented or diminished interval is exactly 12ε (≈ 23.460) cents narrower or wider than its enharmonic equivalent. For instance, the d6 (or wolf fifth) is 12ε cents narrower than each P5, and each A2 is 12ε cents wider than each m3. This interval of size 12ε is known as a Pythagorean comma, exactly equal to the opposite of a diminished second (≈ −23.460 cents). This implies that ε can be also defined as one twelfth of a Pythagorean comma.

== Pythagorean intervals ==
Four of the above-mentioned intervals take a specific name in Pythagorean tuning. In the following table, these specific names are provided, together with alternative names used generically for some other intervals. The Pythagorean comma does not coincide with the diminished second, as its size (524288:531441) is the reciprocal of the Pythagorean diminished second (531441:524288). Also ditone and semiditone are specific for Pythagorean tuning, while tone and tritone are used generically for all tuning systems. Despite its name, a semiditone (3 semitones, or about 300 cents) can hardly be viewed as half of a ditone (4 semitones, or about 400 cents). All the intervals with prefix sesqui- are justly tuned, and their frequency ratio, shown in the table, is a superparticular number (or epimoric ratio). The same is true for the octave.

Number of semitones	Generic names				Specific names		
Number of semitones	Quality and number		Other naming conventions		Pythagorean tuning (pitch ratio names)	5-limit tuning	1/4-comma meantone
Number of semitones	Full	Short	Other naming conventions		Pythagorean tuning (pitch ratio names)	5-limit tuning	1/4-comma meantone
0	augmented seventh (Note: The ascending Pythagorean comma is a Pythagorean augmented seventh lowered by one octave (diapason) from the unison, it is also applied to the descending Pythagorean comma but in the opposite direction contrasting the first one.)	A7	ascending comma		Pythagorean comma (531441:524288)		diesis (128:125)
0	diminished second	d2	descending comma		(524288:531441)		diesis (128:125)
1	minor second	m2	semitone, half tone, half step	diatonic semitone, minor semitone	limma (λείμμα) (256:243)		
1	augmented unison	A1	semitone, half tone, half step	chromatic semitone, major semitone	apotome (ἀποτομή) (2187:2048)		
2	major second	M2	tone, whole tone, whole step		epogdoön (ἐπόγδοον), sesquioctavum (9:8)		
3	minor third	m3			semiditone (32:27)	sesquiquintum (6:5)	
4	major third	M3			ditone (δίτονον) (81:64)	sesquiquartum (5:4)	
5	perfect fourth	P4	diatessaron (διατεσσάρων)		epitrite (ἐπίτριτος), sesquitertium (4:3)		
6	diminished fifth	d5					
6	augmented fourth	A4			tritone (τρίτονον) (729:512)		
7	perfect fifth	P5	diapente (διαπέντε)		hemiolion (ἡμιόλιον), sesquialterum (3:2)		
12	(perfect) octave	P8	diapason (διαπασών)		duplex (2:1)		

== History and usage ==
The system dates to Ancient Mesopotamia, and consisted of alternating ascending fifths and descending fourths; see Music of Mesopotamia § Music theory. Within Ancient Greek music, the system had been mainly attributed to Pythagoras (who lived around 500 BCE) by modern authors of music theory; Ancient Greeks borrowed much of their music theory from Mesopotamia, including the diatonic scale, Pythagorean tuning, and modes. The Chinese Shí-èr-lǜ scale uses the same intervals as the Pythagorean scale and was invented between 600 BCE and 240 CE.

Because of the wolf interval when using a 12-tone Pythagorean temperament, this tuning is rarely used today, although it is thought to have been widespread. In music which does not change key very often, or which is not very harmonically adventurous, the wolf interval is unlikely to be a problem, as not all the possible fifths will be heard in such pieces. In extended Pythagorean tuning there is no wolf interval, all perfect fifths are exactly 3:2.

Because most fifths in 12-tone Pythagorean temperament are in the simple ratio of 3:2, they sound very "smooth" and consonant. The thirds, by contrast, most of which are in the relatively complex ratios of 81:64 (for major thirds) and 32:27 (for minor thirds), sound less smooth depending on the instrument.

From about 1510 onward, as thirds came to be treated as consonances, meantone temperament, and particularly quarter-comma meantone, which tunes thirds to the relatively simple ratio of 5:4, became the most popular system for tuning keyboards. At the same time, syntonic-diatonic just intonation was posited first by Ramos and then by Zarlino as the normal tuning for singers.

However, meantone presented its own harmonic challenges. Its wolf intervals proved to be even worse than those of the Pythagorean tuning (so much so that it often required 19 keys to the octave as opposed to the 12 in Pythagorean tuning). As a consequence, meantone was not suitable for all music. From around the 18th century, as the desire grew for instruments to change key, and therefore to avoid a wolf interval, this led to the widespread use of well temperaments and eventually equal temperament.

Pythagorean temperament can still be heard in some parts of modern classical music from singers and from instruments with no fixed tuning such as the violin family. Where a performer has an unaccompanied passage based on scales, they will tend towards using Pythagorean intonation as that will make the scale sound best in tune, then reverting to other systems for other passages (just intonation for chordal or arpeggiated figures, and equal temperament when accompanied with piano or orchestra). Such changes are never explicitly notated and are scarcely noticeable to the audience, just sounding 'in tune'.

== Discography ==
- Bragod is a duo giving historically informed performances of mediaeval Welsh music using the crwth and six-stringed lyre using Pythagorean tuning
- Gothic Voices – Music for the Lion-Hearted King (Hyperion, CDA66336, 1989), directed by Christopher Page (Leech-Wilkinson)
- Lou Harrison performed by John Schneider and the Cal Arts Percussion Ensemble conducted by John Bergamo - Guitar & Percussion (Etceter Records, KTC1071, 1990): Suite No. 1 for guitar and percussion and Plaint & Variations on "Song of Palestine"

== See also ==
- 53 equal temperament, a near-Pythagorean tuning
- Enharmonic scale
- List of meantone intervals
- List of musical intervals
- List of pitch intervals
- Regular temperament
- Shí-èr-lǜ
- Musical temperament
- Timaeus (dialogue), in which Plato discusses Pythagorean tuning
- Whole-tone scale
