= List of musical intervals =

List of musical intervals may refer to:

- Interval (music)#Main intervals as abstract relations between notes in western music theory.
- List of pitch intervals as frequency ratios in intonation and tuning of musical instruments and performances.
