= List of meantone intervals =

The following is a list of intervals of extended meantone temperament. These intervals constitute the standard vocabulary of intervals for the Western common practice era. Here 12 EDO refers to the size of the interval in the temperament with 12 equal divisions of the octave, which is the most common meantone temperament in the modern era, 19 EDO to 19 equal temperament, 31 EDO to 31 equal temperament, and 50 EDO to 50 equal temperament. Note that for brevity, several of the intervals for 31 EDO and 50 EDO are omitted from the table.

R.W. Duffin writes:

"Specifying that the major semitone should be 3/ 2 the minor semitone [a 3:2 ratio] creates a 31 note division of the octave, which, in turn, closely corresponds to extended-quarter-comma meantone ... the 5:4 ratio [whose] extended-sixth-comma meantone corresponds to the 55 division ... extended-fifth-comma meantone [corresponds to] the 43 division of the octave [in which the] ratio of the major to minor semitone is 4:3."

The other meantone correspondencies:

"a 1:1 ratio produces a 12 division" (1/ 11 comma meantone)
"2:1 [which] results in a 19 division" (1/ 3 comma meantone)
"5:3, which results in a 50 division" (2/ 7 comma meantone)

are derived from these statements.

The column of ratios gives a ratio or ratios approximated by the interval in septimal meantone temperament. An augmented interval is increased by a chromatic semitone, and a diminished interval decreased.

12 EDO (≈1/ 11 c)		Quarter- comma	19 EDO (≈1/ 3 c)		31 EDO (≈1/ 4 c)		50 EDO (≈2/ 7 c)		Note (from C)	Roman numeral	Name	Classic ratios	Septimal ratios
steps	cents	cents	steps	cents	steps	cents	steps	cents	Note (from C)	Roman numeral	Name	Classic ratios	Septimal ratios
0	0	0.00	0	0.00	0	0.00	0	0	C	I	Unison	1:1	
0	0	41.06	1	63.16	1	38.71	2	48	D	II	Diminished second	128:125	36:35
1	100	76.05	1	63.16	2	77.42	3	72	C♯	♯I	Chromatic semitone	25:24	21:20
1	100	117.11	2	126.32	3	116.13	5	120	D♭	♭II	Minor second	16:15, 27:25	15:14
2	200	193.16	3	189.47	5	193.55	8	192	D	II	Whole tone	9:8, 10:9	
2	200	234.22	4	252.63	6	232.26	10	240	E	III	Diminished third	144:125	8:7
3	300	269.21	4	252.63	7	270.97	11	264	D♯	♯II	Augmented second	75:64, 125:108	7:6
3	300	310.26	5	315.79	8	309.68	13	312	E♭	♭III	Minor third	6:5, 32:27	
4	400	386.31	6	378.95	10	387.10	16	384	E	III	Major third	5:4	
4	400	427.37	7	442.11	11	425.81	18	432	F♭	♭IV	Diminished fourth	32:25	9:7
5	500	462.36	7	442.11	12	464.52	19	456	E♯	♯III	Augmented third	125:96	21:16
5	500	503.42	8	505.26	13	503.23	21	504	F	IV	Perfect fourth	4:3, 27:20	
6	600	579.47	9	568.42	15	580.65	24	576	F♯	♯IV	Augmented fourth	25:18, 45:32	7:5
6	600	620.53	10	631.58	16	619.35	26	624	G♭	♭V	Diminished fifth	36:25, 64:45	10:7
7	700	696.58	11	694.74	18	696.77	29	696	G	V	Perfect fifth	3:2, 40:27	
7	700	737.64	12	757.89	19	735.48	31	744	A	VI	Diminished sixth	192:125	32:21
8	800	772.63	12	757.89	20	774.19	32	768	G♯	♯V	Augmented fifth	25:16	14:9
8	800	813.69	13	821.05	21	812.90	34	816	A♭	♭VI	Minor sixth	8:5	
9	900	889.74	14	884.21	23	890.32	37	888	A	VI	Major sixth	5:3, 27:16	
9	900	930.79	15	947.37	24	929.03	39	936	B	VII	Diminished seventh	128:75, 216:125	12:7
10	1000	965.78	15	947.37	25	967.74	40	960	A♯	♯VI	Augmented sixth	125:72	7:4
10	1000	1006.84	16	1010.53	26	1006.45	42	1008	B♭	♭VII	Minor seventh	9:5, 16:9	
11	1100	1082.89	17	1073.68	28	1083.87	45	1080	B	VII	Major seventh	15:8, 50:27	28:15
11	1100	1123.95	18	1136.84	29	1122.58	47	1128	C♭	♭VIII	Diminished octave	48:25	40:21
12	1200	1158.94	18	1136.84	30	1161.29	48	1152	B♯	♯VII	Augmented seventh	125:64	35:18
12	1200	1200.00	19	1200.00	31	1200.00	50	1200	C	VIII	Octave	2:1	

== See also ==
- List of musical intervals
- List of pitch intervals
