= Minor seventh =

Musical interval

- Inverse: Major second

Name
- Abbreviation: m7

Tuning
- 12 equal temperament: 10 semitones (1000 cents)
- Pythagorean tuning: 16:9 (~996.09 cents)
- 5-limit tuning: 9:5 (~1017.60 cents)
- 7-limit tuning: 7:4 (~968.83 cents)

In music theory, a minor seventh is one of two musical intervals that span seven staff positions. It is minor because it is the smaller of the two sevenths, spanning ten semitones. The major seventh spans eleven. For example, the interval from A_{3} to G_{4} (in scientific pitch notation) is a minor seventh, as the note G_{4} lies ten semitones above A_{3}, and there are seven staff positions from A_{3} to G_{4}.

Diminished and augmented sevenths span the same number of staff positions, but consist of a different number of semitones (nine and twelve, respectively).

== Use ==
Minor seventh intervals rarely feature in melodies (and especially in their openings) but occur more often than major sevenths. A well-known example, in part due to its frequent use in theory classes, is found between the first two words of the phrase "There's a place for us" in the song "Somewhere" in West Side Story. Another well-known example occurs between the first two notes of the introduction to the main theme music from Star Trek: The Original Series theme.

The most common occurrence of the minor seventh is built on the root of the prevailing key's dominant triad, producing the all-important dominant seventh chord.

During the common practice period the minor seventh was prescribed as a dissonance, requiring resolution to a consonance.

== In other temperaments ==
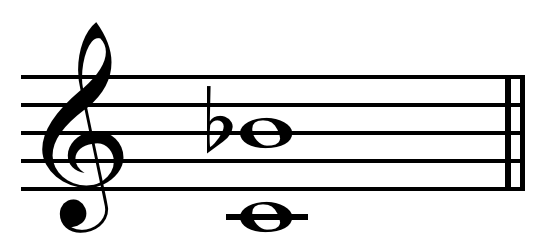
Minor seventh equal tempered or just.

In just intonation there is both a 16:9 "lesser just minor seventh", also called the "Pythagorean small minor seventh", equivalent to two perfect fourths stacked on top of each other, and 9:5, called the "greater just minor seventh" equivalent to a perfect fifth and a minor third on top of each other. An interval close in frequency is the harmonic seventh.

== See also ==
- Minor seventh chord
- Musical tuning
- List of meantone intervals
- Harmonic seventh
