= The Lost Chord (disambiguation) =

"The Lost Chord" is the title of an 1877 song composed by Arthur Sullivan.

The Lost Chord may also refer to:

- The Lost Chord (1917 film), a British film by Wilfred Noy
- The Lost Chord (1911 film), an Australian film by W. J. Lincoln
- The Lost Chord (1925 film), a lost American film by Wilfred Noy
- The Lost Chord (1933 film), a British film by Maurice Elvey
- "The Lost Chord" (The Worst Witch), a 2001 episode of The Worst Witch
- "The Lost Chord", a 2020 episode of the web series Song Machine by Gorillaz featuring Leee John
- In Search of the Lost Chord, an album by The Moody Blues, released in 1968
- The Harmonic seventh chord
