= Diminished seventh =

- Inverse: Augmented second

Name
- Other names: -
- Abbreviation: d7

Size
- Semitones: 9
- Interval class: 3
- Just interval: 128:75, 216:125, 32768:19683, 26:15

Cents
- 12-Tone equal temperament: 900
- Just intonation: 925, 947, 882, 952.3

In classical music from Western culture, a diminished seventh is an interval produced by narrowing a minor seventh by a chromatic semitone, and its inversion is the augmented second. For instance, the interval from A to G is a minor seventh, ten semitones wide, and both the intervals from A♯ to G, and from A to G♭ are diminished sevenths, spanning nine semitones.

Being diminished, it is considered a dissonant interval. The diminished seventh is used quite readily in the minor key, where it is present in the harmonic minor scale between the seventh scale step and the sixth scale step in the octave above.

In 12-tone equal temperament, a diminished seventh is equal to nine semitones, a ratio of 2^{9/12}:1 (approximately 1.6818), or 900 cents, and is enharmonically equivalent to a major sixth. There is no standard just tuning of this interval, but one possibility, assuming the flat submediant is a perfect (5:4) major third below the octave, and the leading tone to be 15:16, would lead to an interval of 128:75, about 925 cents; another interval is 216:125, which is three minor thirds. However, in 19 equal temperament, it is enharmonically equivalent to an augmented sixth, having a ratio of 2^{15/19}:1 (approximately 1.7284), or 947 cents.

The 128:75 just diminished seventh arises in the C harmonic minor scale between B and A♭ by combining B-D, D|F, F-A♭.

== Usage in musical expression ==
Since the Baroque era, Western European composers have used the diminished seventh as a melodic interval to convey intense, sometimes troubled emotion. Richard Taruskin (2010, p. 258) draws attention to the falling melodic figures in the bass (pedal) part of J. S. Bach's organ chorale prelude from the Orgelbüchlein, "Durch Adams Fall":

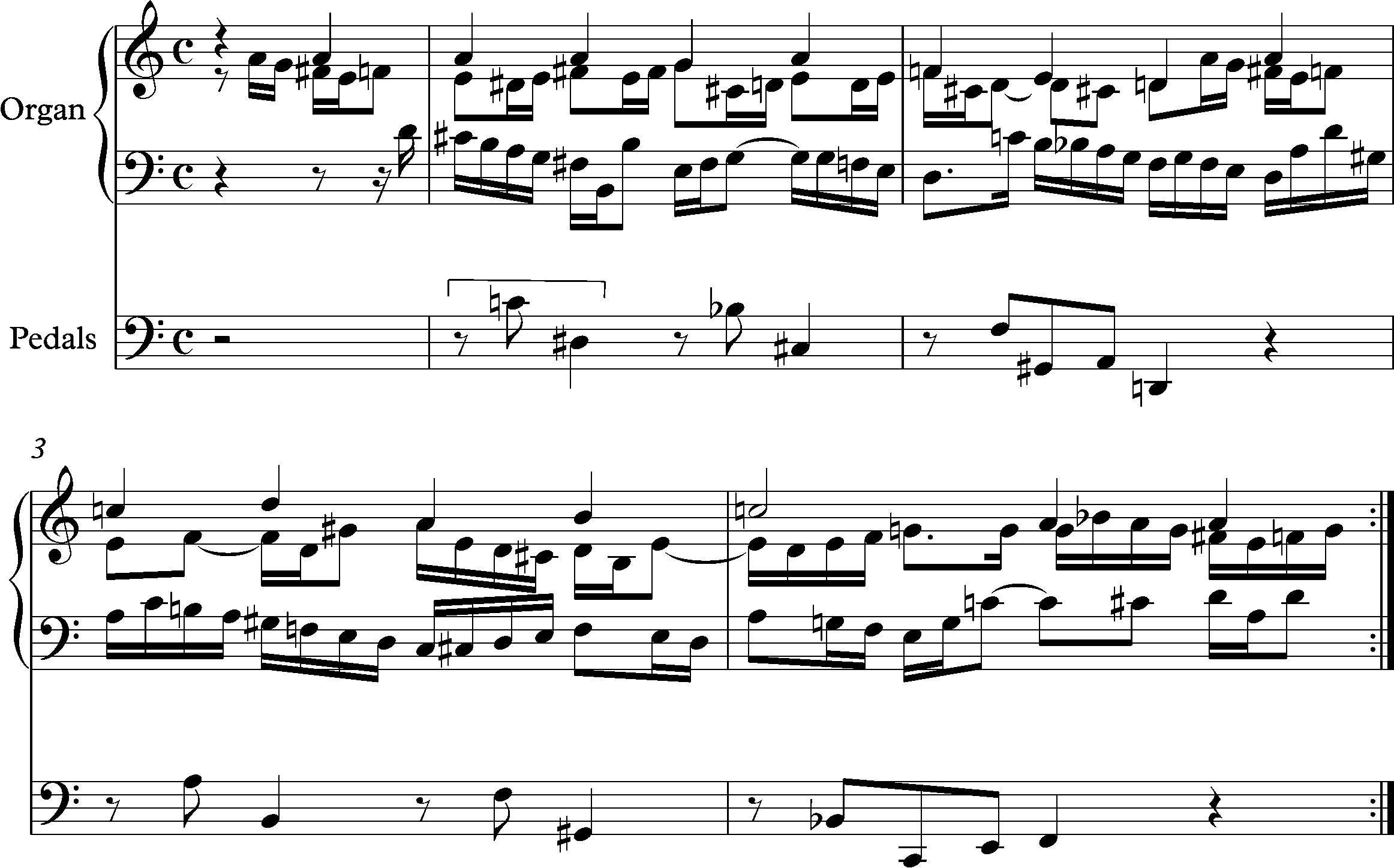
J.S.Bach, "Durch Adams Fall" from Orgelbüchlein. Listen

"What is a powerful surprise, and further evidence of Bach’s unique imaginative boldness, is the specific form the obbligato pedal part takes in this chorale setting: almost nothing but dissonant drops of a seventh – Adam’s fall made audible! And not just the fall, but also the attendant pain and suffering are depicted (and in a way evoked), since so many of those sevenths are diminished."

The expressive potential of the interval was not lost on Mozart, especially when, as Dennis Matthews (1971, p. iii) puts it, "Mozart reserved a minor home-key for his most disquieting utterances." The opening theme of the Piano Concerto in C minor K491, features rising diminished sevenths:

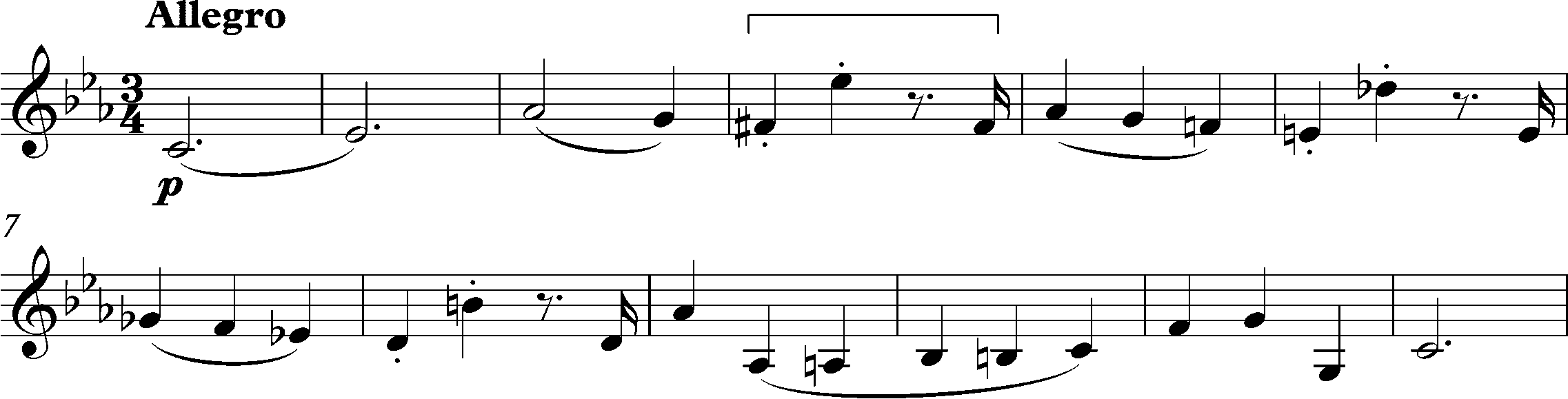
Mozart, Piano Concerto in C minor, K491, opening theme. Listen

More startling is the finale of Mozart's G minor Symphony No. 40, K550, which critic Charles Rosen (1971, p324) calls "a work of passion, violence and grief." The development section features a disorienting sequence of diminished sevenths:

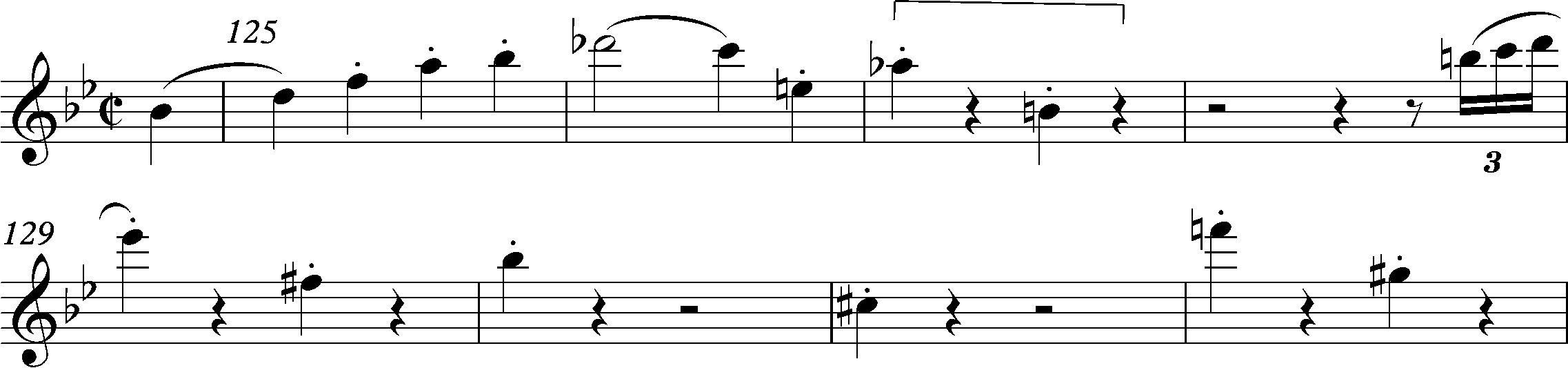
Mozart, Symphony No. 40, finale, bars 125–130. Link to passage

The dramatic clout of the interval was further exploited by operatic composers during the nineteenth century. Robert Donington (1963, p. 175) heard the dark, atmospheric Prelude to Wagner’s opera Siegfried as "a kind of elemental brooding…Its material is an uneasy sequence of thirds low in the bass, and separated by a diminished seventh.":

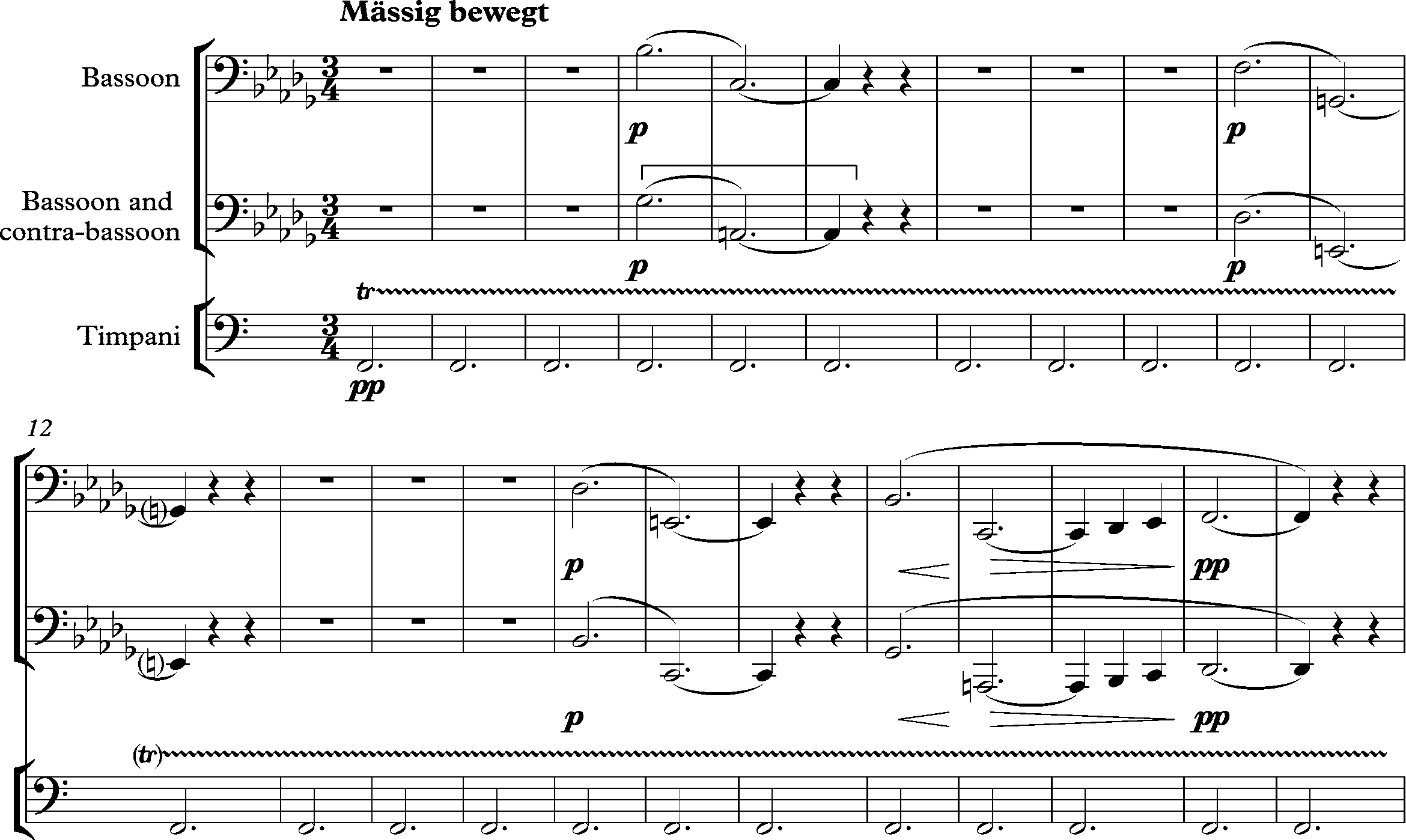
Wagner, Siegfried, opening prelude. Listen

== See also ==
- Diminished seventh chord
