= Meantone temperament =

Musical tuning system

Meantone temperament is a musical tuning system. In meantone temperament the size of perfect fifths is reduced in order to improve the intonation of thirds. The system derives its name from the geometric mean used to split the major third into two equal tones. The technique includes a wide variety of tuning solutions. Meantone temperament was in use as early as the 15th century, remained common into the 19th, and is still in limited use today.

== Definition ==
A meantone is equidistant from two other notes. Musical intervals are tempered when their tunings are altered. Meantone temperament is commonly defined as one in which a major third is divided by two equal whole tones. The two whole tones are sized as the geometric mean of 5:4, the major third's natural ratio derived from the harmonic series.

The basic meantone temperament employs flattened fifths with pure thirds. Unlike the perfect fifths in Pythagorean tuning, meantone tempers the intervals to be slightly smaller than their original 3:2 ratio of just intonation. The reduction of the fifth to a ^{4}√5:1 ratio enables justly tuned thirds in the 5:4 ratio. Because all of the meantone fifths are the same size, the system is classified as a regular temperament.

Equal temperament is the most widely used tuning standard. It renders all semitones the same size, making them meantones. Their ratio is ^{12}√2 :1, equal to one-twelfth of an octave.

== History ==
The need for a universal tuning system stems from the natural ratios of just intonation, which generate semitones in four different sizes. Intervals that sound in tune in one key may not in another. For fixed pitch instruments like keyboards, the problem of tuning in more than one key was a persistent problem, particularly as music grew more chromatic.

Meantone tuning was in common use by the late 15th century, although in a variety of names and methods. In his 1482 treatise Musica Practica, Bartolomé Ramos de Pareja wrote about the system. A description of meantone tuning was published by Franchinus Gaffurius in 1496. Pietro Aron wrote a harpsichord tuning manual in 1523 which included a possible description of what would later be called quarter-comma meantone. In his system, the third between C and E is justly tuned, and then the fifth between C and G is tempered a little flat. Lodovico Fogliani described a tuning solution that hinted at Aron's.

Gioseffo Zarlino described in clear mathematical terms a "new temperament" in 1571 which corresponds to quarter-comma meantone. Writing six years later, Francisco de Salinas suggested that he had been using this system since the 1530s. In 1618, Michael Praetorius prescribed quarter-comma meantone temperament for keyboard instruments, and the tuning became known in Germany as "Praetorianische Temperatur". Marin Mersenne relied heavily on de Salinas' work in the description of quarter-comma meantone from Harmonie universelle, his seminal 1636 work on music theory. Mersenne described the "perfect clavier" as one with 32 keys per octave.

Atomization of the octave in furtherance of meantone temperament was an ongoing concern in the 17th century. Advocates of the 31-note octave include Lemme Rossi (1666), Joseph Zaragoza (1674), and Christiaan Huygens (1691). Jean Gallé, Isaac Newton, and Nicholas Mercator supported the 53-part division of the octave.

The reduction of the fifth from its natural proportion was not always seen as a flaw of meantone temperament. Wolfgang Printz heard the acoustical beating of tempered fifths as charming. Composers may have taken advantage of the effect to simulate vibrato in their work.

As equal temperament became standard, meantone was still widely in use, particularly on organs. Early music performers often currently prefer meantone temperament. Composers like John Adams (Absolute Jest, 2012) and György Ligeti (Passacaglia ungherese, 1978) have also written in the system.

== Method ==
Comparison of perfect fifths, major thirds, and minor thirds in various meantone tunings with just intonation

Tuners could apply the same methods that "by ear" tuners have always used: Go up by fifths, and down by octaves, or down by fifths, and up by octaves, tempering the fifths so they are slightly smaller than the just 3:2 ratio. How tuners could identify a "quarter comma" reliably by ear is a bit more subtle. Since this amounts to about 0.3% of the frequency which, near middle C (~264 Hz), is about one hertz, they could do it by using perfect fifths as a reference and adjusting the tempered note to produce beats at this rate. However, the frequency of the beats would have to be slightly adjusted, proportionately to the frequency of the note. Alternatively the diatonic scale major thirds can be adjusted to just major thirds, of 5:4 ratio, by eliminating the beats.

For 12-tone equally-tempered tuning, the fifths have to be tempered by considerably less than a 1/4 comma (very close to a 1/11 syntonic comma, or a 1/12 Pythagorean comma), since they must form a perfect cycle, with no gap at the end ("circle of fifths"). For 1/4 comma meantone tuning, if one artificially stops after filling the octave with only 12 pitches, one has a residual gap between sharps and their enharmonic flats that is slightly smaller than the Pythagorean one, in the opposite direction. Both quarter-comma meantone and the Pythagorean system do not have a circle but rather a spiral of fifths, which continues indefinitely. Slightly tempered versions of the two systems that do close into a much larger circle of fifths are 31 tet for meantone, and 53 tet for Pythagorean.

== Notable meantone temperaments ==
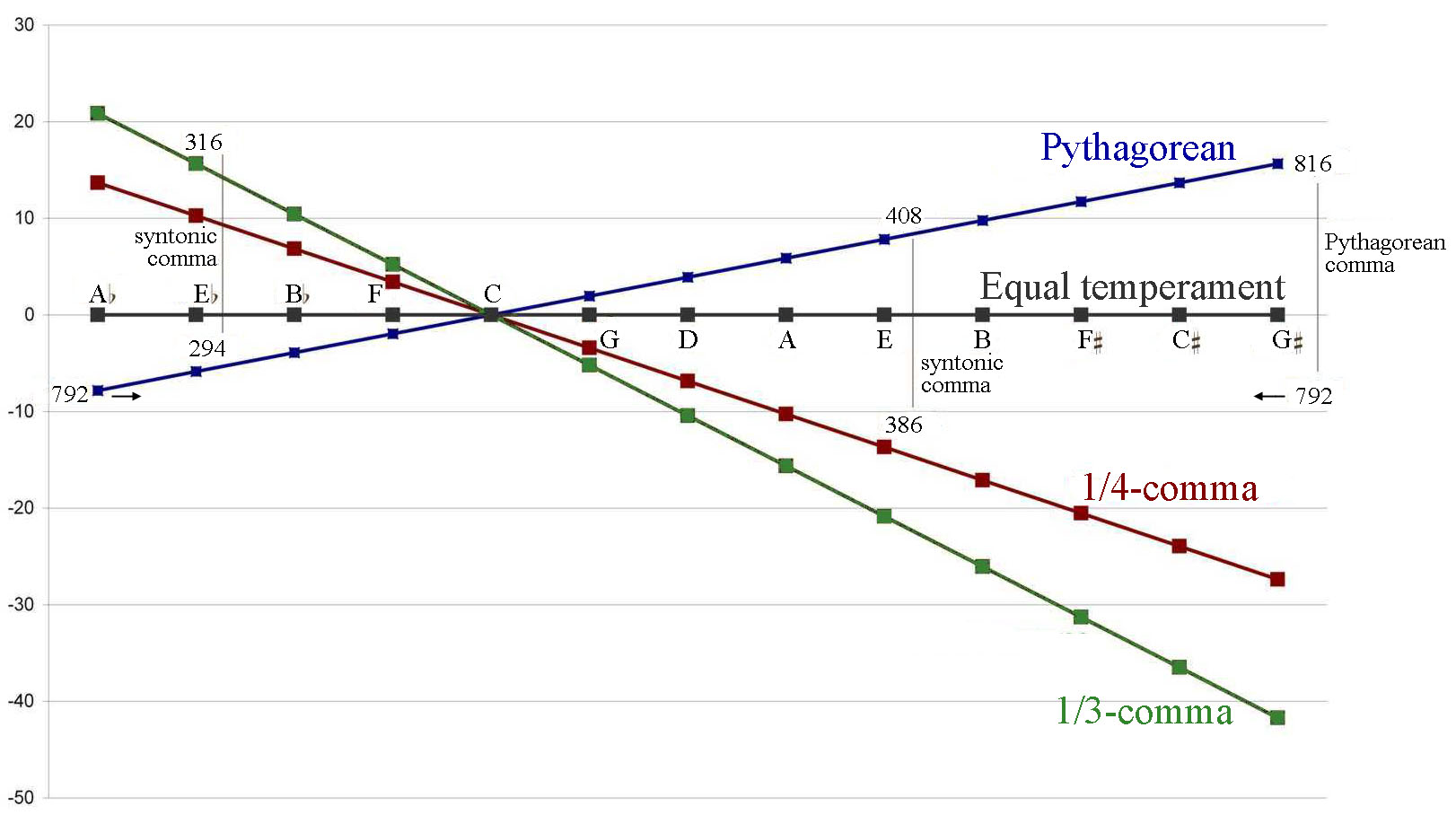
Figure 1. Comparison between Pythagorean tuning (blue), equal-tempered (black), quarter-comma meantone (red) and third-comma meantone (green). For each, the common origin is arbitrarily chosen as C. The values indicated by the scale at the left are deviations in cents with respect to equal temperament.

Quarter-comma meantone, which tempers each of the twelve perfect fifths by 1 / 4 of a syntonic comma, is the best known type of meantone temperament, and the term meantone temperament is often used to refer to it specifically. Four ascending fifths (as C G D A E) tempered by 1 / 4 comma (and then lowered by two octaves) produce a just major third (C E) (with ratio 5 : 4), which is one syntonic comma (or about 22 cents) narrower than the Pythagorean third that would result from four perfect fifths.

It was commonly used from the early 16th century till the early 18th, after which twelve-tone equal temperament eventually came into general use. For church organs and some other keyboard purposes, it continued to be used well into the 19th century, and is sometimes revived in early music performances today. Quarter-comma meantone can be well approximated by a division of the octave into 31 equal steps.

It proceeds in the same way as Pythagorean tuning; i.e., it takes the fundamental (say, C) and goes up by six successive fifths (always adjusting by dividing by powers of 2 to remain within the octave above the fundamental), and similarly down, by six successive fifths (adjusting back to the octave by multiplying by powers of 2 ). However, instead of using the 3 / 2 ratio, which gives perfect fifths, this must be divided by the fourth root of 81 / 80 , which is the syntonic comma: the ratio of the Pythagorean third 81 / 64 to the just major third 5 / 4 . Equivalently, one can use ^{4}√5 instead of 3 / 2 , which produces the same slightly reduced fifths. This results in the interval C E being a just major third 5 / 4 , and the intermediate seconds (C D, D E) dividing C E uniformly, so D C and E D are equal ratios, whose square is 5 / 4 . The same is true of the major second sequences F G A and G A B.

However, there is a residual gap in quarter-comma meantone tuning between the last of the upper sequence of six fifths and the last of the lower sequence; e.g. between F^{♯} and G♭ if the starting point is chosen as C, which, adjusted for the octave, are in the ratio of 125 / 128 or −41.06 cents. This is in the sense opposite to the Pythagorean comma (i.e. the upper end is flatter than the lower one) and nearly twice as large.

In third-comma meantone, the fifths are tempered by 1 / 3 of a syntonic comma. It follows that three descending fifths (such as A D G C) produce a just minor third (A C) of ratio 6 / 5 , which is one syntonic comma wider than the minor third resulting from Pythagorean tuning of three perfect fifths. Third-comma meantone can be very well approximated by a division of the octave into 19 equal steps.

== The tone as a mean ==
The name "meantone temperament" derives from the fact that in all such temperaments the size of the whole tone, within the diatonic scale, is somewhere between the major and minor tones (9:8 and 10:9 respectively) of just intonation, which differ from each other by a syntonic comma. In any regular system the whole tone (as C D) is reached after two fifths (as C G D) (lowered by an octave), while the major third is reached after four fifths (C G D A E) (lowered by two octaves). It follows that in 1 / 4 comma meantone the whole tone is exactly half of the just major third (in cents) or, equivalently, the square root of the frequency ratio of 5 / 4 .

One sense in which the tone is a mean is that, as a frequency ratio, it is the geometric mean of the major tone and the minor tone: $\ \sqrt{ \tfrac{ 10 }{\ 9\ } \cdot \tfrac{\ 9\ }{ 8 }\ } = \sqrt{ \tfrac{\ 5\ }{ 4 }\ } = 1.1180340\ ,$ equivalent to 193.157 cents: the quarter-comma whole-tone size. However, any intermediate tone qualifies as a "mean" in the sense of being intermediate, and hence as a valid choice for some meantone system.

In the case of quarter-comma meantone, where the major third is made narrower by a syntonic comma, the whole tone is made half a comma narrower than the major tone of just intonation (9:8), or half a comma wider than the minor tone (10:9). This is the sense in which quarter-tone temperament is often considered "the" exemplary meantone temperament since, in it, the whole tone lies midway (in cents) between its possible extremes.

== Meantone temperaments ==
A meantone temperament is a regular temperament, distinguished by the fact that the correction factor to the Pythagorean perfect fifths, given usually as a specific fraction of the syntonic comma, is chosen to make the whole tone intervals equal, as closely as possible, to the geometric mean of the major tone and the minor tone. Historically, commonly used meantone temperaments, discussed below, occupy a narrow portion of this tuning continuum, with fifths ranging from approximately 695 to 699 cents.

Meantone temperaments can be specified in various ways: By what fraction of a syntonic comma the fifth is being flattened (as above), the width of the tempered perfect fifth in cents, or the ratio of the whole tone (in cents) to the diatonic semitone. This last ratio was termed "R" by American composer, pianist and theoretician Easley Blackwood. If R happens to be a rational number $\ R = \scriptstyle{ \frac{\ N\ }{ D } }\ ,$ then $\ 2^{\frac{\ 3 R + 1\ }{ 5 R + 2} }\$ is the closest approximation to the corresponding meantone tempered fifth within the equitempered division of the octave into $\ 5\ N + 2\ D\$ equal parts. Such divisions of the octave into a number of small parts greater than 12 are sometimes refererred to as microtonality, and the smallest intervals called microtones.

In these terms, some historically notable meantone tunings are listed below, and compared with the closest equitempered microtonal tuning. The first column gives the fraction of the syntonic comma by which the perfect fifths are tempered in the meantone system. The second lists 5 limit rational intervals that occur within this tuning. The third gives the fraction of an octave, within the corresponding equitempered microinterval system, that best approximates the meantone fifth. The fourth gives the difference between the two, in cents. The fifth is the corresponding value of the fraction $\ R = \scriptstyle{ \frac{\ N\ }{ D } }\ ,$ and the fifth is the number $\ 5\ N + 2\ D\$ of equitempered (ET ) microtones in an octave.

Meantone vs. Equitempered tunings
Meantone fraction of (syntonic) comma	5-limit rational intervals	Size of ET fifths as fractions of an octave	Error between meantone fifths and ET fifths (in cents)	Blackwood’s ratio R =$\scriptstyle{\frac{N}{D}}$	Number of ET microtones $5N +2D$
1/ 315 (very nearly Pythagorean tuning)	For all practical purposes, the fifth is a "perfect" 3 / 2 .	31 / 53	+0.000066 (+6.55227×10^{−5})	9 / 4 = 2.25	53
1/ 11 ( or 1/ 12 Pythagorean comma)	16384 / 10935 = 2^{14} /( 3^{7} × 5 ) ( Kirnberger fifth: a just fifth flattened by a schisma. Equals meantone to 6 significant figures.)	7 / 12	+0.000116 (+1.16371×10^{−4})	2 / 1 = 2.00	12
1 / 6	45 / 32 and 64 / 45 (tritones)	32 / 55	−0.188801	9 / 5 = 1.80	55
1 / 5	16/ 15 and 15/ 8 (diatonic semitone and major seventh)	25 / 43	+0.0206757	7 / 4 = 1.75	43
1 / 4	5 / 4 and 8 / 5 (just major third and minor sixth)	18 / 31	+0.195765	5 / 3 = 1.66	31
2 / 7	25 / 24 and 48 / 25 (chromatic semitone and major seventh )	29 / 50	+0.189653	8 / 5 = 1.60	50
1 / 3	6/ 5 and 5/ 3 (just minor third and major sixth)	11 / 19	−0.0493956	3 / 2 = 1.50	19
2 / 5	27/ 25 (large limma)	26 / 45	+0.0958	7 / 5 = 1.40	45
1 / 2	10/ 9 and 9/ 5 (just minor tone and greater just minor seventh)	19 / 33	−0.292765	5/ 4 = 1.25	33

== Extended meantones ==
All meantone tunings fall into the valid tuning range of the syntonic temperament, so all meantone tunings are syntonic tunings. All syntonic tunings, including the meantones and the various just intonations, conceivably have an infinite number of notes in each octave, that is, seven natural notes, seven sharp notes (F^{♯} to B^{♯}), seven flat notes (B^{♭} to F^{♭}) (which is the limit of the orchestral harp, which allows 21 distinct pitches per octave); then double sharp notes (F to B), double flat notes (F to B), triple sharps and flats, and so on. In fact, double sharps and flats are uncommon, but still needed, but triple sharps and flats are almost never seen, so might be skipped or compromised. In any syntonic tuning that happens to divide the octave into a small number of equally wide smallest intervals (such as 12, 19, or 31 ET), this extended set of notes still exists, but is not infinite, since some notes will be equivalent. For example, in 19 ET, E^{♯} and F^{♭} are the same pitch; in 31 ET, C^{♯} and E are identical, as are E and G; and in just intonation for C major, C^{♯} D are within 8.1 ¢, and so can be tempered to be identical, with the compromise note being only a tolerable 4 ¢ off for each.

The conventional piano keyboard only has twelve note-producing keys per octave, making it poorly suited to any tunings other than 12 ET or well temperaments. Almost all of the historic problems with the meantone temperament are caused by the failure to map meantone's infinite number of notes per octave to a finite number of piano keys. This is, for example, the source of the "wolf fifth". When choosing which notes to map to the piano's black keys, it is convenient to choose those notes that are common to a small number of closely related keys, but this will only work up to the edge of the octave; when crossing up or down to an adjacent octave, for some of the intervals must be a wolf fifth – that is, slightly flatter than the others.

The existence of the wolf fifth is one of the reasons why, before the introduction of well temperament, instrumental music generally stayed in a number of "safe" tonalities that did not involve the wolf fifth (which was generally put between G^{♯} and E^{♭}).

Throughout the Renaissance and Enlightenment, theorists as varied as Nicola Vicentino, Francisco de Salinas, Fabio Colonna, Marin Mersenne, Christiaan Huygens, and Isaac Newton advocated the use of meantone tunings that were extended beyond the keyboard's twelve notes, and hence these are now called "extended" meantone tunings. Such efforts required a corresponding extension of keyboard instruments to provide means of producing more than 12 notes per octave; examples include Vincento's archicembalo, Mersenne's 19 ET harpsichord, Colonna's 31 ET sambuca rota, and Huygens's 31 ET harpsichord.

Other instruments extended the keyboard by only a few notes. Some period harpsichords and organs have split D^{♯} / E^{♭} keys, such that both E major / C^{♯} minor (4 sharps) and E^{♭} major / C minor (3 flats) can be played with no wolf fifths. Many of those instruments also have split G^{♯} / A^{♭} keys, and a few have all the five accidental keys split.

All of these alternative instruments were "complicated" and "cumbersome" (Isacoff 2009), due to

(a) not being isomorphic, and
(b) not having a transposing mechanism,

which can significantly reduce the number of note-controlling buttons needed on an isomorphic keyboard (Plamondon 2009). Both of these criticisms could be addressed by electronic isomorphic keyboard instruments (such as the open-source hardware jammer keyboard), which could be simpler, less cumbersome, and more expressive than existing keyboard instruments.

== See also ==
- Dynamic tonality
- Equal temperament
- Interval
- Just intonation
- List of meantone intervals
- Mathematics of musical scales
- Pythagorean tuning
- Regular temperament
- Semitone
- Well temperament
- Wolf interval
