= Just intonation =

Musical tuning based on pure intervals

Just intonation is the tuning of a musical interval without beats. The result is an acoustically pure sound that resonates within the harmonic series. The simplest relationships between pitches in this series can be expressed as small whole number ratios. Musicians around the world instinctively perform in just intonation.

Just intonation also describes any musical tuning system containing five or more pure intervals within an octave. Elaborate theories and instruments have been constructed in pursuit of a just intonation system that is fully chromatic.

== Definition ==
Partials 1–5 of the harmonic series.

Any time an interval is sounded without acoustical beats, it is in just intonation. The sound is also described as pure. The frequency of each note in a pure interval will correspond to the whole number ratios in the harmonic series.

In the harmonic series on C, the 1st and 2nd harmonics form an octave in a 2:1 ratio. The fifth between the G and C is in a 3:2 ratio. The fourth is a 4:3 ratio. When its frequency is doubled, A440 Hertz sounds an octave higher at 880 Hz. The pitch sounds an octave lower when the frequency is halved to 220 Hz.

Just intonation also describes a tuning system that contains five or more pure intervals in an octave. There have been many attempts to construct scales composed completely of justly tuned intervals.

== History ==
Musicians instinctively perform in just intonation when possible. Singers and string players gravitate towards pure intervals. Brass players default to just tuning when possible. Barbershop quartets naturally sing in just intonation.

In Ancient Greece, intervals like the octave, fifth, and fourth were recognized as consonances, respectively referred to as diapason, diapente, and diatessaron. Using a monochord, Pythagoras discovered that simple fractions of the string length correspond to these consonant intervals. When two notes are sounded together, the resulting interval is perceived as more consonant when their overtones are in accordance. Clashing overtones will result in acoustic beats. When an interval is performed without audible beats, it was historically described as pure or just.

Constructing a scale out of just intervals requires compromise. A completely chromatic scale in just intonation was an unachievable ideal. Because of the difficulty of justly tuning fixed pitch instruments, the manifold attempts to do so have been likened to a quest for the Holy Grail in its simultaneous futility and worthiness.

Pythagoras and Eratosthenes are credited with a solution that became known as Pythagorean tuning. However, the system is evidenced in much older Babylonian artifacts. Ptolemy and Didymus the Musician developed their own versions of the system.

In China, the guqin draws on just intonation for its tuning system. Indian classical music has an extensive theoretical framework for tuning in just intonation.

Just intonation fettered music to a limited range of resonant harmonies and key changes. Several musical temperaments were developed that standardized intervals, stabilizing music-making and enabling wider tonal experimentation for Western composers. The system that became standard was 12-tone equal temperament. With its division of the octave into twelve identical steps based on a ratio of the 12th root of 2 (≈1.0595), equal temperament uses irrational numbers to create a practical system.

In the 20th century, many composers returned to just intonation. Some developed their own scales or instruments in order to use the tuning. Harry Partch, Lou Harrison, Terry Riley, John Adams, Ben Johnston, La Monte Young, and Glenn Branca are just a few of the contemporary composers that used just intonation. Computers greatly aided the performance of just intoned music through software that could facilitate dynamic tuning.

== Scales ==
Pythagorean tuning generates a scale by relying on the just intonation of fifths and octaves in their natural ratios, 3:2 and 2:1. Just fifths are tuned in the same way violinists tune their open strings. By creating a series of fifths, a justly tuned pentatonic scale can easily be formed. Pythagorean tuning was used on early Renaissance keyboard instruments.

Using this technique to tune a chromatic scale creates a problem. A stack of 12 justly tuned fifths will terminate in a slightly different place than a stack of 7 perfect octaves. The final note in the series of fifths is 23.5 cents wide of its destination, which should be seven octaves higher than the initial note. This gap is the Pythagorean comma. It is impossible to return to the unison.

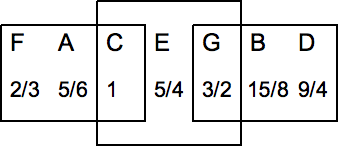
Derivation of the 5-limit just diatonic scale from the major triad.

Another major flaw of the Pythagorean tuning system are its badly mistuned major thirds. One solution is to build a scale around a major triad in just intonation with a 5:4 ratio for the major third and a 3:2 ratio for the perfect fifth.

In his second century AD book Harmonics, Ptolemy calculated an intense diatonic scale with ratios of string lengths 120, 112 1/2, 100, 90, 80, 75, 66 2/3, and 60. This scale allows for the just major third in its natural 5:4 ratio. Harry Partch described this scale as "one of the world's fundamentally beautiful tonal sequences".

The ratios of just intonation can be governed by three prime numbers: 2, 3, 5. These primes can be factors which generate the ratios governing a scale. Harry Partch originated the idea that the limit of a scale was its highest prime factor. By this classification, the Pythagorean scale is a 3-limit scale. A scale with the 5:4 major third is in 5-limit tuning. Modern composers expanded the limit to 7, which creates far more complex tuning solutions. Partch experimented with prime number limits as high as 17.

== Notation ==
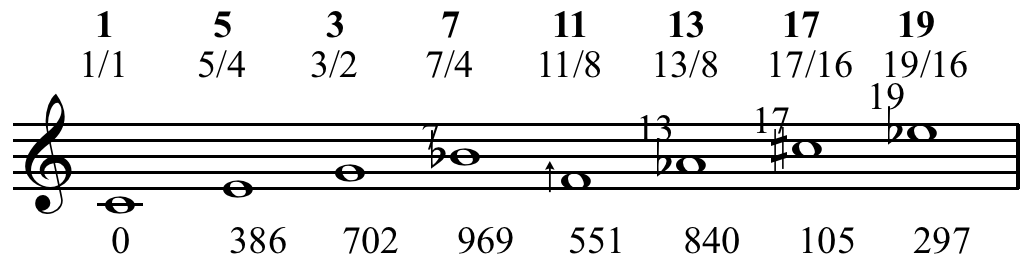
Ben Johnston's notation of partials 1, 3, 5, 7, 11, 13, 17, and 19 on C.

Justly tuned scales often yield multiple versions of the same interval, which can be managed through notation. Moritz Hauptmann developed a system of notation to describe scales. Hermann von Helmholtz adapted it in On the Sensations of Tone as a Physiological Basis for the Theory of Music (1877). The system used a combination of + and - signs in addition to subscript numbers.

Carl Eitz developed a similar system which was adapted by J. Murray Barbour. Superscript numbers indicate the number of syntonic commas to apply to the tuning. The basic just intonation scale appears as C^{0} – D^{0} – E^{−1} – F^{0} – G^{0} – A^{−1} – B^{−1} – C^{0}.

In the 1960s, Ben Johnston developed an extended just intonation. He also used + and − signs in his notation.

Composers like James Tenney employed just intonation by marking cents deviations from equal tempered pitches in his scores. Musicians often employ tuning devices during performances. Sagittal notation uses arrows as accidentals. The size of the symbol indicates the size of the alteration.

== Audio examples ==
- C major primary triads in just intonation
- Just intonation An A-major scale, followed by three major triads, and then a progression of fifths in just intonation.
- Equal temperament An A-major scale, followed by three major triads, and then a progression of fifths in equal temperament. The beating in this file may be more noticeable after listening to the above file.
- Equal temperament and just intonation compared A pair of major thirds, followed by a pair of full major chords. The first in each pair is in equal temperament; the second is in just intonation. Piano sound.
- Equal temperament and just intonation compared with square waveform A pair of major chords. The first is in equal temperament; the second is in just intonation. The pair of chords is repeated with a transition from equal temperament to just intonation between the two chords. In the equal temperament chords a roughness or beating can be heard at about 4 Hz and about 0.8 Hz. In the just intonation triad, this roughness is absent. The square waveform makes the difference between equal temperament and just intonation more obvious.
- Just major third on C
- Partials 1–19

== See also ==
Lists

- List of meantone intervals
- List of pitch intervals

Article topics

- Dynamic tonality
- Electronic tuner
- Hexany
- Microtonal music
- Microtuner
- Music and mathematics
- Musical interval
- Pythagorean interval
- Regular number
- Superparticular ratio
- Whole-tone scale
