= Cent (music) =

Musical interval unit

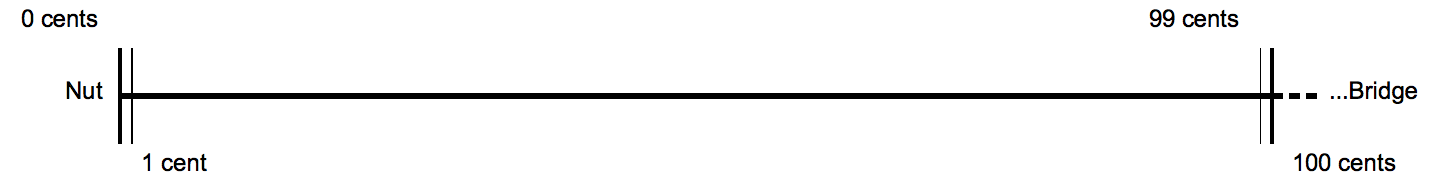
One cent compared to a semitone on a truncated monochord.

Octaves increase exponentially when measured on a linear frequency scale (Hz).

Octaves are equally spaced when measured on a logarithmic scale (cents).

The cent is a logarithmic unit of measure used for musical intervals. Twelve-tone equal temperament divides the octave into 12 semitones of 100 cents each. Typically, cents are used to express small intervals, to check intonation, or to compare the sizes of comparable intervals in different tuning systems. For humans, a single cent is too small to be perceived between successive notes.

Cents, as described by Alexander John Ellis, follow a tradition of measuring intervals by logarithms that began with Juan Caramuel y Lobkowitz in the 17th century. (Note: Caramuel mentioned the possible use of binary logarithms for music in a letter to Athanasius Kircher in 1647; this usage often is attributed to Leonhard Euler in 1739 (see Binary logarithm). Isaac Newton described musical logarithms using the semitone (^{12}√2) as base in 1665; Gaspard de Prony did the same in 1832. Joseph Sauveur in 1701, and Félix Savart in the first half of the 19th century, divided the octave in 301 or 301,03 units. See Barbieri 1987, pp. 145–168 and also Stigler's law of eponymy.) Ellis chose to base his measures on the hundredth part of a semitone, $\sqrt[1200]{2}$, at Robert Holford Macdowell Bosanquet's suggestion. Making extensive measurements of musical instruments from around the world, Ellis used cents to report and compare the scales employed, and further described and utilized the system in his 1875 edition of Hermann von Helmholtz's On the Sensations of Tone. It has become the standard method of representing and comparing musical pitches and intervals.

== History ==
Alexander John Ellis' paper On the Musical Scales of Various Nations, published by the Journal of the Society of Arts in 1885, officially introduced the cent system to be used in exploring, by comparing and contrasting, musical scales of various nations. The cent system had already been defined in his History of Musical Pitch, where Ellis writes:

If we supposed that, between each pair of adjacent notes, forming an equal semitone [...], 99 other notes were interposed, making exactly equal intervals with each other, we should divide the octave into 1200 equal hundrecths [sic] of an equal semitone, or cents as they may be briefly called.

Ellis defined the pitch of a musical note in his 1880 work History of Musical Pitch to be

the number of double or complete vibrations, backwards and forwards, made in each second by a particle of air while the note is heard.

He later defined musical pitch to be "the pitch, or V [for "double vibrations"] of any named musical note which determines the pitch of all the other notes in a particular system of tunings." He notes that these notes, when sounded in succession, form the scale of the instrument, and an interval between any two notes is measured by "the ratio of the smaller pitch number to the larger, or by the fraction formed by dividing the larger by the smaller". Absolute and relative pitches were also defined based on these ratios.

Ellis noted that

the object of the tuner is to make the interval [...] between any two notes answering to any two adjacent finger keys throughout the instrument precisely the same. The result is called equal temperament or tuning, and is the system at present used throughout Europe.

He further gives calculations to approximate the measure of a ratio in cents, adding that

it is, as a general rule, unnecessary to go beyond the nearest whole number of cents.

Ellis presents applications of the cent system in this paper on musical scales of various nations, which include: (I. Heptatonic scales) Ancient Greece and Modern Europe, Persia, Arabia, Syria and Scottish Highlands, India, Singapore, Burmah and Siam,; (II. Pentatonic scales) South Pacific, Western Africa, Java, China and Japan. And he reaches the conclusion that

the Musical Scale is not one, not 'natural', nor even founded necessarily on the laws of the constitution of musical sound, so beautifully worked out by Helmholtz, but very diverse, very artificial, and very capricious.

== Use ==
Comparison of equal-tempered (black) and Pythagorean (green) intervals showing the relationship between frequency ratio and the intervals' values, in cents.

A cent is a unit of measure for the ratio between two frequencies. An equally tempered semitone (the interval between two adjacent piano keys) spans 100 cents by definition. An octave—two notes that have a frequency ratio of 2:1—spans twelve semitones and therefore 1200 cents. The ratio of frequencies one cent apart is precisely equal to 2^{1/1200} = ^{1200}√2, the 1200th root of 2, which is approximately 1.0005777895. Thus, raising a frequency by one cent corresponds to multiplying the original frequency by this constant value. Raising a frequency by 1200 cents doubles the frequency, resulting in its octave.

If one knows the frequencies $f_1$ and $f_2$ of two notes, the number of cents $c$ measuring the interval from $f_1$ to $f_2$ is:

$$c = 1200 \cdot \log_2 \left( \frac{f_2}{f_1} \right)$$

Likewise, if one knows $f_1$ and the number of cents $c$ in the interval from $f_1$ to $f_2$, then $f_2$ equals:

$$f_2 = f_1 \times 2 ^ \frac{c}{1200} \, .$$

=== Comparison of major third in just and equal temperament ===
The major third in just intonation has a frequency ratio 5:4 or ~386 cents, but in equal temperament is 400 cents. This 14 cent difference is about a seventh of a half step and large enough to be clearly audible, and noticeably dissonant to musicians trained in meantone scales for period-authentic performance.

== Piecewise linear approximation ==
As x increases from 0 to 1/12, the function 2^{x} increases almost linearly from 1.00000 to 1.05946, allowing for a piecewise linear approximation. Thus, although cents represent a logarithmic scale, small intervals (under 100 cents) can be loosely approximated with the linear relation 1 + 0.0005946 $c$ instead of the true exponential relation 2^{c/1200}. The rounded error is zero when $c$ is 0 or 100, and is only about 0.72 cents high at $c$=50 (whose correct value of 2^{1/24} ≅ 1.02930 is approximated by 1 + 0.0005946 × 50 ≅ 1.02973). This error is well below anything humanly audible, making this piecewise linear approximation adequate for most practical purposes.

== Human perception ==
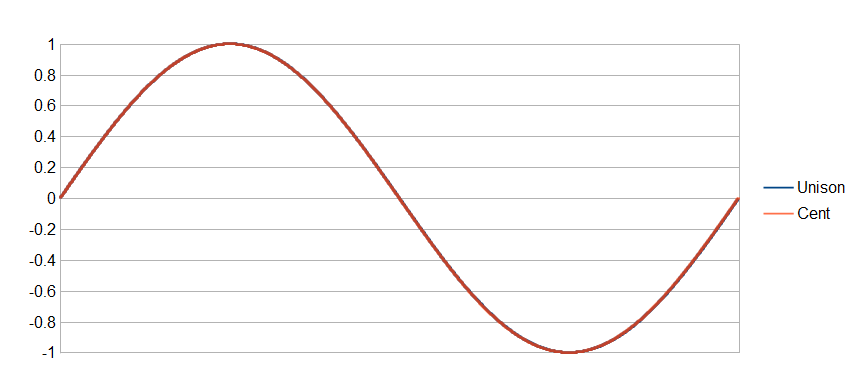
The waveforms of a unison (blue) vis-à-vis a cent (red) are practically indistinguishable.

It is difficult to establish how many cents are perceptible to humans; this precision varies greatly from person to person. One author stated that humans can distinguish a difference in pitch of about 5–6 cents. The threshold of what is perceptible, technically known as the just noticeable difference (JND), also varies as a function of the frequency, the amplitude and the timbre. In one study, changes in tone quality reduced student musicians' ability to recognize, as out-of-tune, pitches that deviated from their appropriate values by ±12 cents. It has also been established that increased tonal context enables listeners to judge pitch more accurately. "While intervals of less than a few cents are imperceptible to the human ear in a melodic context, in harmony very small changes can cause large changes in beats and roughness of chords."

When listening to pitches with vibrato, there is evidence that humans perceive the mean frequency as the center of the pitch. One study of modern performances of Schubert's Ave Maria found that vibrato span typically ranged between ±34 cents and ±123 cents with a mean of ±71 cents and noted higher variation in Verdi's opera arias.

Normal adults are able to recognize pitch differences of as small as 25 cents very reliably. Adults with amusia, however, have trouble recognizing differences of less than 100 cents and sometimes have trouble with these or larger intervals.

== Other representations of intervals by logarithms ==
=== Octave ===
The representation of musical intervals by logarithms is almost as old as logarithms themselves. Logarithms had been invented by Lord Napier in 1614. As early as 1647, Juan Caramuel y Lobkowitz (1606-1682) in a letter to Athanasius Kircher described the usage of base-2 logarithms in music. In this base, the octave is represented by 1, the semitone by 1/12, etc.

=== Heptamerides ===
Joseph Sauveur, in his Principes d'acoustique et de musique of 1701, proposed the usage of base-10 logarithms, probably because tables were available. He made use of logarithms computed with three decimals. The base-10 logarithm of 2 is equal to approximately 0.301, which Sauveur multiplies by 1000 to obtain 301 units in the octave. In order to work on more manageable units, he suggests to take 7/301 to obtain units of 1/43 octave. (Note: 301 can be divided only by 7 or by 43.) The octave therefore is divided in 43 parts, named "merides", themselves divided in 7 parts, the "heptamerides". Sauveur also imagined the possibility to further divide each heptameride in 10, but does not really make use of such microscopic units.

=== Prony ===
Early in the 19th century, Gaspard de Prony proposed a logarithmic unit of base $\sqrt[12]{2}$, where the unit corresponds to a semitone in equal temperament. Alexander John Ellis in 1880 describes a large number of pitch standards that he noted or calculated, indicating in pronys with two decimals, i.e. with a precision to the 1/100 of a semitone, the interval that separated them from a theoretical pitch of 370 Hz, taken as point of reference.

=== Centitones ===
A centitone (also Iring) is a musical interval (2^{1/600}, $\sqrt[600]{2}$) equal to two cents (2^{2/1200}) proposed as a unit of measurement by Widogast Iring in Die reine Stimmung in der Musik (1898) as 600 steps per octave and later by Joseph Yasser in A Theory of Evolving Tonality (1932) as 100 steps per equal tempered whole tone.

Iring noticed that the Grad/Werckmeister (1.96 cents, 12 per Pythagorean comma) and the schisma (1.95 cents) are nearly the same (≈ 614 steps per octave) and both may be approximated by 600 steps per octave (2 cents). Yasser promoted the decitone, centitone, and millitone (10, 100, and 1000 steps per whole tone = 60, 600, and 6000 steps per octave = 20, 2, and 0.2 cents).

For example: Equal tempered perfect fifth = 700 cents = 175.6 savarts = 583.3 millioctaves = 350 centitones.

Centitones	Cents
1 centitone	2 cents
0.5 centitone	1 cent
2^{1/600}	2^{1/1200}
50 per semitone	100 per semitone
100 per whole tone	200 per whole tone

=== Savart ===
The savart was proposed by Auguste Guillemin in 1902, named after Félix Savart (1791-1841), who however had never considered the possibility of measuring intervals by logarithms. The attribution to Savart himself appeared later in several Anglo-Saxon sources.

Guillemin first defined the savart as the decimal logarithm itself, 1 savart being the logarithm of the decade (10/1), and the millisavart as the base-10 logatrithm times 1000. This later was taken to be the savart itself.

The savart has been described without limiting the number of decimals, so that the value of his unit varies according to sources. With five decimals, the base-10 logarithm of 2 is 0.30103, giving 301.03 savarts in the octave. This value often is rounded to 1/301 or to 1/300 octave.

== Sound files ==
The following audio files play various intervals. In each case the first note played is middle C. The next note is sharper than C by the assigned value in cents. Finally, the two notes are played simultaneously.

Note that the JND for pitch difference is 5–6 cents. Played separately, the notes may not show an audible difference, but when they are played together, beating may be heard (for example if middle C and a note 10 cents higher are played). At any particular instant, the two waveforms reinforce or cancel each other more or less, depending on their instantaneous phase relationship. A piano tuner may verify tuning accuracy by timing the beats when two strings are sounded at once.

, beat frequency = 0.16 Hz
, beat frequency = 1.53 Hz
, beat frequency = 3.81 Hz

One Cent Interval
Sine wave plays at middle C, middle C 1 cent sharp, then both at the same time.

Twelve Cent Interval
Sine wave plays at middle C, middle C 12 cents sharp, then both at the same time.

Twenty-four Cent Interval
Sine wave plays at middle C, middle C 24 cents sharp, then both at the same time.

== See also ==
- Degree
- Gradian
- Microtonality
- Radian
