= Limma =

The word limma or leimma (from Greek: λείμμα, leimma; meaning "remnant") can refer to several different musical intervals, and one form of breath-mark to indicate spacing within lyrics; their only common property is that all are very small either in pitch difference or in time.

== Pitch ==
More specifically, in Pythagorean tuning (i.e. 3-limit):

- The original Pythagorean limma, 256/ 243 , a Pythagorean interval.

and in 5-limit tuning:

- The 5-limit diatonic semitone, 16/ 15. Although closer in size to the Pythagorean apotome than to the limma, it has been so called because of its function as a diatonic semitone rather than a chromatic one.
- The 5-limit limma (now a diesis), 128/ 125 , the amount by which three just major thirds fall short of an octave.
- The major limma, 135/ 128 , which is the difference between two major whole tones and a minor third.

== Metre ==
A leimma is also the name of a musical / metrical symbol (𝉅) for the timing of sung lyrics. If written over lyrics to it directed the singer to insert the shortest possible pause between words or syllables it was placed over.

Modern equivalents are:

- a breath mark
- a comma [,]
- a sixteenth rest (𝄿 ) or perhaps a thirty-second rest (𝅀 )
