= Pythagorean interval =

Musical interval

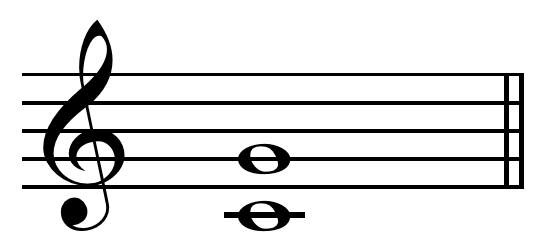
Pythagorean perfect fifth on C: C-G (3/2 ÷ 1/1 = 3/2).

In musical tuning theory, a Pythagorean interval is a musical interval with a frequency ratio equal to a power of two divided by a power of three, or vice versa. For instance, the perfect fifth with ratio 3/2 (equivalent to 3^{1}/ 2^{1}) and the perfect fourth with ratio 4/3 (equivalent to 2^{2}/ 3^{1}) are Pythagorean intervals.

All the intervals between the notes of a scale are Pythagorean if they are tuned using the Pythagorean tuning system. However, some Pythagorean intervals are also used in other tuning systems. For instance, the above-mentioned Pythagorean perfect fifth and fourth are also used in just intonation.

== Interval table ==
Name	Short	Other name(s)	Ratio	Factors	Derivation	Cents	ET Cents	MIDI file	Fifths
diminished second	d2		524288/531441	2^{19}/3^{12}		−23.460	0		−12
(perfect) unison	P1		1/1	3^{0}/2^{0}	1/1	0.000	0		0
Pythagorean comma			531441/524288	3^{12}/2^{19}		23.460	0		12
minor second	m2	limma, diatonic semitone, minor semitone	256/243	2^{8}/3^{5}		90.225	100		−5
augmented unison	A1	apotome, chromatic semitone, major semitone	2187/2048	3^{7}/2^{11}		113.685	100		7
diminished third	d3	tone, whole tone, whole step	65536/59049	2^{16}/3^{10}		180.450	200		−10
major second	M2	tone, whole tone, whole step	9/8	3^{2}/2^{3}	3·3/2·2	203.910	200		2
semiditone	m3	(Pythagorean minor third)	32/27	2^{5}/3^{3}		294.135	300		−3
augmented second	A2		19683/16384	3^{9}/2^{14}		317.595	300		9
diminished fourth	d4		8192/6561	2^{13}/3^{8}		384.360	400		−8
ditone	M3	(Pythagorean major third)	81/64	3^{4}/2^{6}	27·3/32·2	407.820	400		4
perfect fourth	P4	diatessaron, sesquitertium	4/3	2^{2}/3	2·2/3	498.045	500		−1
augmented third	A3		177147/131072	3^{11}/2^{17}		521.505	500		11
diminished fifth	d5	tritone	1024/729	2^{10}/3^{6}		588.270	600		−6
augmented fourth	A4	tritone	729/512	3^{6}/2^{9}		611.730	600		6
diminished sixth	d6		262144/177147	2^{18}/3^{11}		678.495	700		−11
perfect fifth	P5	diapente, sesquialterum	3/2	3^{1}/2^{1}	3/2	701.955	700		1
minor sixth	m6		128/81	2^{7}/3^{4}		792.180	800		−4
augmented fifth	A5		6561/4096	3^{8}/2^{12}		815.640	800		8
diminished seventh	d7		32768/19683	2^{15}/3^{9}		882.405	900		−9
major sixth	M6		27/16	3^{3}/2^{4}	9·3/8·2	905.865	900		3
minor seventh	m7		16/9	2^{4}/3^{2}		996.090	1000		−2
augmented sixth	A6		59049/32768	3^{10}/2^{15}		1019.550	1000		10
diminished octave	d8		4096/2187	2^{12}/3^{7}		1086.315	1100		−7
major seventh	M7		243/128	3^{5}/2^{7}	81·3/64·2	1109.775	1100		5
diminished ninth	d9	(octave − comma)	1048576/531441	2^{20}/3^{12}		1176.540	1200		−12
(perfect) octave	P8	diapason	2/1		2/1	1200.000	1200		0
augmented seventh	A7	(octave + comma)	531441/262144	3^{12}/2^{18}		1223.460	1200		12

Notice that the terms ditone and semiditone are specific for Pythagorean tuning, while tone and tritone are used generically for all tuning systems. Despite its name, a semiditone (3 semitones, or about 300 cents) can hardly be viewed as half of a ditone (4 semitones, or about 400 cents).

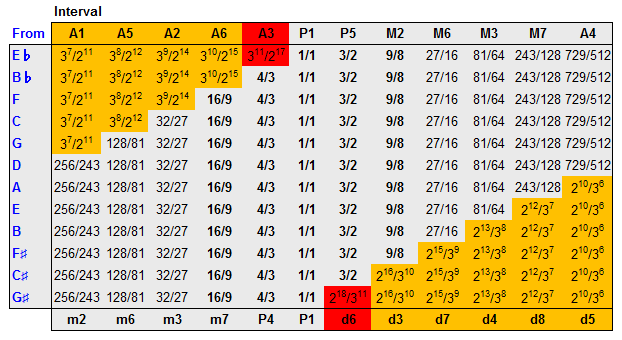
Frequency ratio of the 144 intervals in D-based Pythagorean tuning. Interval names are given in their shortened form. Pure intervals are shown in bold font. Wolf intervals are highlighted in red. Numbers larger than 999 are shown as powers of 2 or 3. Other versions of this table are provided here and here.

=== 12-tone Pythagorean scale ===
The table shows from which notes some of the above listed intervals can be played on an instrument using a repeated-octave 12-tone scale (such as a piano) tuned with D-based symmetric Pythagorean tuning. Further details about this table can be found in Size of Pythagorean intervals.

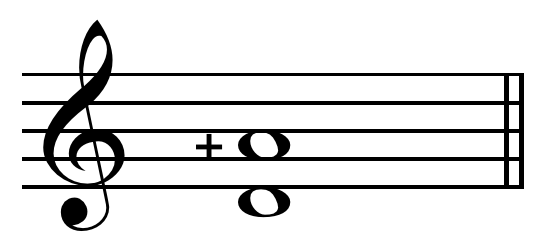
Pythagorean perfect fifth on D: D-A+ (27/16 ÷ 9/8 = 3/2).

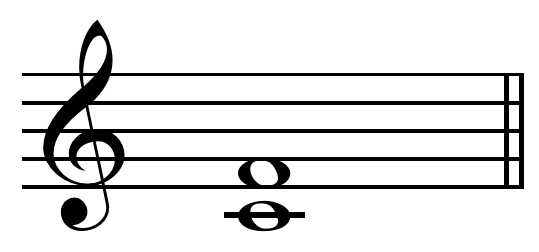
Just perfect fourth, one perfect fifth inverted (4/3 ÷ 1/1 = 4/3).

Major tone on C: C-D (9/8 ÷ 3/2 = 3/2), two Pythagorean perfect fifths.

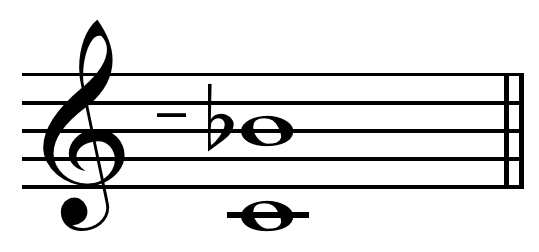
Pythagorean small minor seventh (1/1 - 16/9), two perfect fifths inverted.

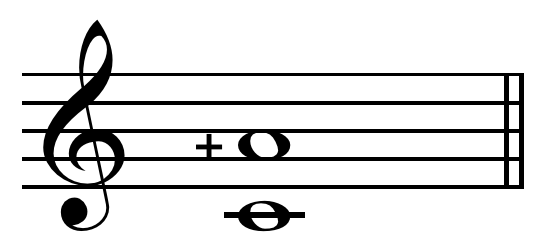
Pythagorean major sixth on C (1/1 - 27/16), three Pythagorean perfect fifths.

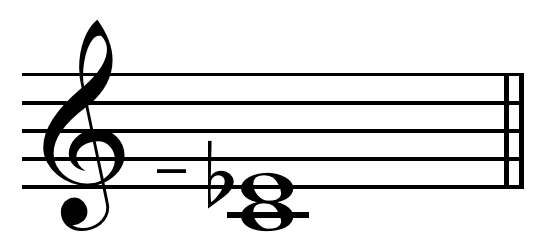
Semiditone on C (1/1 - 32/27), three Pythagorean perfect fifths inverted.

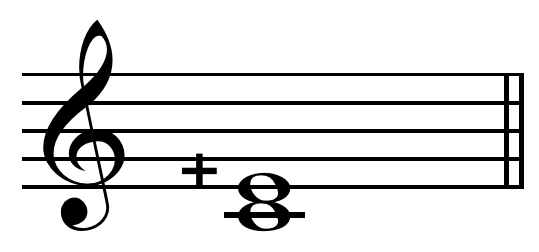
Ditone on C (1/1 - 81/64), four Pythagorean perfect fifths.

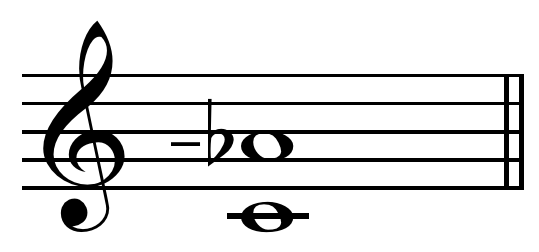
Pythagorean minor sixth on C (1/1 - 128/81), four Pythagorean perfect fifths inverted.

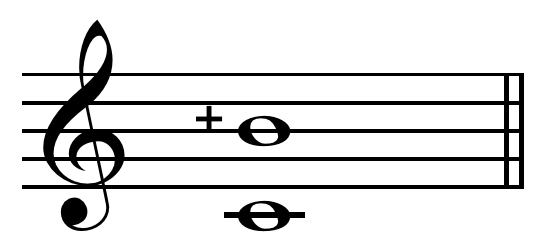
Pythagorean major seventh on C (1/1 - 243/128), five Pythagorean perfect fifths.

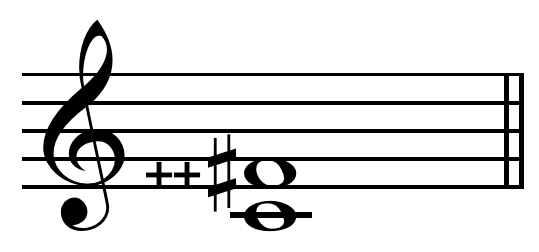
Pythagorean augmented fourth tritone on C (1/1 - 729/512), six Pythagorean perfect fifths.

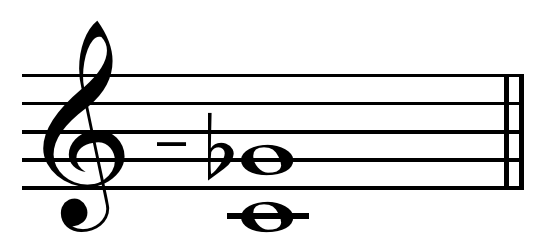
Pythagorean diminished fifth tritone on C (1/1 - 1024/729), six Pythagorean perfect fifths inverted.

== Fundamental intervals ==
The fundamental intervals are the superparticular ratios 2/1, 3/2, and 4/3. 2/1 is the octave or diapason (Greek for "across all"). 3/2 is the perfect fifth, diapente ("across five"), or sesquialterum. 4/3 is the perfect fourth, diatessaron ("across four"), or sesquitertium. These three intervals and their octave equivalents, such as the perfect eleventh and twelfth, are the only absolute consonances of the Pythagorean system. All other intervals have varying degrees of dissonance, ranging from smooth to rough.

The difference between the perfect fourth and the perfect fifth is the tone or major second. This has the ratio 9/8, also known as epogdoon and it is the only other superparticular ratio of Pythagorean tuning, as shown by Størmer's theorem.

Two tones make a ditone, a dissonantly wide major third, ratio 81/64. The ditone differs from the just major third (5/4) by the syntonic comma (81/80). Likewise, the difference between the tone and the perfect fourth is the semiditone, a narrow minor third, 32/27, which differs from 6/5 by the syntonic comma. These differences are "tempered out" or eliminated by using compromises in meantone temperament.

The difference between the minor third and the tone is the minor semitone or limma of 256/243. The difference between the tone and the limma is the major semitone or apotome ("part cut off") of 2187/2048. Although the limma and the apotome are both represented by one step of 12-pitch equal temperament, they are not equal in Pythagorean tuning, and their difference, 531441/524288, is known as the Pythagorean comma.

== Contrast with modern nomenclature ==
There is a one-to-one correspondence between interval names (number of scale steps + quality) and frequency ratios. This contrasts with equal temperament, in which intervals with the same frequency ratio can have different names (e.g., the diminished fifth and the augmented fourth); and with other forms of just intonation, in which intervals with the same name can have different frequency ratios (e.g., 9/8 for the major second from C to D, but 10/9 for the major second from D to E).

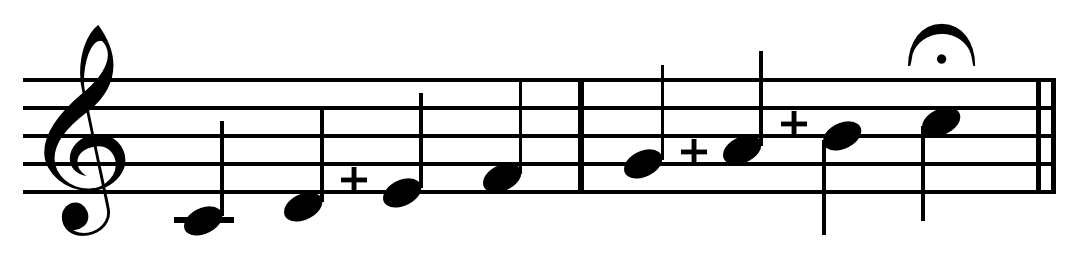
Pythagorean diatonic scale on C.

== See also ==
- Generated collection
- Just intonation
- List of meantone intervals
- Shí-èr-lǜ
- Whole-tone scale
