= Diesis (disambiguation) =

Diesis is a small modification of music pitch.

Diesis may also refer to:

- Diesis (horse) (1980-2006)
- Diesis (typography) (‡), also known as a double dagger
- Sharp (music) (♯)
