= Wolf interval =

Dissonant musical interval

A wolf interval is audibly out of tune within a particular musical tuning system. A common example is the abnormally small fifth that results from the Pythagorean comma.

== Definition ==
Particularly out of tune intervals produce an unpleasant effect that remind listeners of a wolf's howl. Wolf fifths are produced by a specific tuning system, widely used in the sixteenth and seventeenth centuries: the quarter-comma meantone temperament. More broadly, it is also used to refer to similar intervals (of close, but variable magnitudes) produced by other tuning systems, including Pythagorean and most meantone temperaments. Wolf fifths were sometimes labeled imperfect or Procrustean.

When the twelve notes within the octave of a chromatic scale are tuned using the quarter-comma meantone systems of temperament, one of the twelve intervals apparently spanning seven semitones is actually a diminished sixth, which turns out to be much wider than the in-tune genuine fifths, (Note: Specifically, the actual note present on the keyboard where the desired next fifth would be, is not a fifth, but rather a diminished sixth.) In mean-tone systems, this interval is usually from C♯ to A♭ or from G♯ to E♭ but can be moved in either direction to favor certain groups of keys. The eleven perfect fifths sound almost perfectly consonant. Conversely, the diminished sixth used as a substitute is severely dissonant: It sounds like the howl of a wolf, because of a phenomenon called beating. Since the diminished sixth is nominally enharmonically equivalent to a perfect fifth, but in meantone temperament, enharmonic notes are only nearby (within about 1/4 sharp or 1/4 flat); the discordance of substituted interval is called the "wolf fifth".

Besides the above-mentioned quarter comma meantone, other tuning systems may produce severely dissonant diminished sixths. Conversely, in 12 tone equal temperament (12-TET), which is currently the most commonly used tuning system, the diminished sixth is not a wolf fifth, as it has exactly the same size as a perfect fifth.

By extension, any interval which is perceived as severely dissonant and regarded as "howling like a wolf" is called a wolf interval. For instance, in quarter comma meantone, the augmented second, augmented third, augmented fifth, diminished fourth, and diminished seventh may be called wolf intervals, as their frequency ratio significantly deviates from the ratio of the corresponding justly tuned interval (see Size of quarter-comma meantone intervals).

== Temperament ==
The reason for "wolf" tones in meantone tunings is the bad practice of performers pressing the key for an enharmonic note as a substitute for a note that has not been tuned on the keyboard; e.g. pressing the black key tuned to G♯ when the music calls for A♭. In all meantone tuning systems, sharps and flats are not equivalent; a relic of which, that persists in modern musical practice, is to fastidiously distinguish the musical notation for two notes which are the same pitch in equal temperament ("enharmonic") and played with the same key on an equal tempered keyboard (such as C♯ and D♭, or E♯ and F♮), despite the fact that they are the same in all but theory.

In order to close the circle of fifths in 12 note scales, twelve fifths must average out to 700 cents. (Note: No such 700 cents exact average for fifth inervals exists meantone systems: Their fifths – and all repeated intervals – form a helix, not a circle.) Each of the first eleven fifths (starting with the fifth below the tonic, the subdominant: F in the key of C, when each black key is tuned to a meantone sharp / no flats) has a value of 700 − ε cents, where ε is some small number of cents that all fifths are detuned by. (Note: The size of ε is around 1–4 cents, and is different for each particular meantone system used. As a technicality, equal temperament happens to be a meantone temperament for which the value of ε is zero.) In meantone temperament tuning systems, the twelfth and last fifth does not exist in the 12 note octave on the keyboard.

The actual note available is really a diminished sixth: The interval is 700 + 11 ε cents, and is not a correct meantone fifth, which would be 700 − ε cents. The difference of 12 ε cents between the available pitch and the intended pitch is the source of the "wolf". The "wolf" effect is particularly grating for values of 12 ε cents that approach 20~25 cents. (Note: 20~25 cents, or a quarter-sharp / quarter flat, is the typical size of the several discrepant musical intervals called "commas". Note that a quarter-comma is a different interval than a quarter-sharp.)

With only 12 notes available in a conventional keyboard's octave, in meantone tunings there must always be omitted notes. For example, one choice for tuning an instrument in meantone, to play music in the key of C♮, would be

**A**	[no A♯]	**B♭**	**B**	[no B♯ and no C♭]	**C**	**C♯**	[no D♭]
**D**	[no D♯]	**E♭**	**E**	[no E♯ and no F♭]	**F**	**F♯**	[no G♭]	**G**	**G♯** [choose one of either G♯ or A♭]

with this set of chosen notes in bold face, and some of the omitted notes shown in grey. (Note: Of course, double sharps and double flats are infeasible for the key of C major / A minor.)

This limitation on the set meantone notes and their sharps and flats that can be tuned on a keyboard at any one time, was the main reason that Baroque period keyboard and orchestral harp performers were obliged to retune their instruments in mid-performance breaks, in order to make available all the accidentals called for by the next piece of music. (Note: If a performer could get the use of an extra instrument, an alternative to retuning is to switch seats to a spare instrument already tuned for the upcoming piece.) (Note: Note that wind instruments, bowed stringed instruments, and singers have no such need for a retuning session, since players always microtune every note they produce "on the fly". On the other hand, players of stringed instruments with movable frets, such as the oud face a similar problem; performers on fixed-fret instruments likewise are limited to the keys which are compatible with the positions of the frets, although it is possible to microtune by tugging on a string using the finger that presses it down.)

Some music that modulates too far between keys cannot be played on a single keyboard or single harp, no matter how it is tuned: In the example tuning above, music that modulates from C major into both A major (which needs G♯ for the seventh note) and C minor (which needs A♭ for its sixth note) is not possible, since each of the two meantone notes, G♯ and A♭, both require the same string in each octave on the instrument to be tuned to their different pitches.

For expediency, keyboard players substitute the wrong diminished sixth interval for a genuine meantone fifth, or neglect retuning their instrument. Though not available, a genuine meantone fifth would be consonant, but in meantone tuning systems (where ε isn't zero) the sharp of any note is always different from the flat of the note above it. A meantone keyboard that allowed unlimited modulation theoretically would require an infinite number of separate sharp and flat keys, and then double sharps and double flats, and so on: There must inevitably be missing pitches on a standard keyboard with only 12 notes in an octave.

The value of ε changes depending on the tuning system. In other tuning systems (such as Pythagorean tuning and twelfth-comma meantone), each of the eleven fifths may have a size of 700 + ε cents, thus the diminished sixth is 700 − 11 ε cents. If their difference, 12 ε , is very large, as in the quarter-comma meantone tuning system, the diminished sixth is used as a substitute for a fifth, it is called a "wolf fifth".

In terms of frequency ratios, in order to close the circle of fifths, the product of the fifths' ratios must be 128 (since the twelve fifths, if closed in a circle, span seven octaves exactly; an octave is 2:1, and 2^{7} = 128), and if f is the size of a fifth, 128 : f^{11}, or f^{11} : 128, will be the size of the wolf.

We likewise find varied tunings for the thirds: Major thirds must average 400 cents, and to each pair of thirds of size 400 ∓ 4 ε cents we have a third (or diminished fourth) of 400 ± 8 ε cents, leading to eight thirds 4 ε cents narrower or wider, and four diminished fourths 8 ε cents wider or narrower than average. Three of these diminished fourths form major triads with perfect fifths, but one of them forms a major triad substituting the diminished sixth for a real fifth. If the diminished sixth is a wolf interval, this triad is called the wolf major triad.

Similarly, we obtain nine minor thirds of 300 ± 3 ε cents and three minor thirds (or augmented seconds) of 300 ∓ 9 ε cents.

=== Quarter comma meantone ===
In quarter-comma meantone, the frequency ratio for the fifth is ^{4}√ 5 , which is about 3.42157 cents flatter than an equal tempered 700 cents, (or exactly one twelfth of a diesis) and so the wolf is about 737.637 cents, or 35.682 cents sharper than a perfect fifth of ratio exactly 3:2, and this is the original "howling" wolf fifth.

The flat minor thirds are only about 2.335 cents sharper than a subminor third of ratio 7:6, and the sharp major thirds, of ratio exactly 32:25, are about 7.712 cents flatter than the supermajor third of 9:7 . Meantone tunings with slightly flatter fifths produce even closer approximations to the subminor and supermajor thirds and corresponding triads. These thirds therefore hardly deserve the appellation of wolf, and in fact historically have not been given that name.

The wolf fifth of quarter-comma meantone can be approximated by the 7-limit just interval 49:32, which has a size of 737.652 cents.

=== Pythagorean tuning ===
In 12-tone Pythagorean temperament, there are eleven justly tuned fifths sharper than 700 cents by about 1.955 cents (or exactly one twelfth of a Pythagorean comma), and hence one fifth will be flatter by twelve times that, which is 23.460 cents (one Pythagorean comma), making it 678.495 cents, flatter than a just fifth of 701.955 cents. A fifth this flat can also be regarded as "howling like a wolf." There are also now eight sharp and four flat major thirds.

=== Five-limit tuning ===
Five-limit tuning was designed to maximize the number of pure intervals, but even in this system several intervals are markedly impure. 5-limit tuning yields a much larger number of wolf intervals with respect to Pythagorean tuning, which can be considered a 3-limit just intonation tuning. Namely, while Pythagorean tuning determines only 2 wolf intervals (a fifth and its inversion, a fourth), the 5-limit symmetric scales produce 12 of them, and the asymmetric scale 14.

The two fifths, three minor thirds, and three major sixths marked in orange in the tables (ratio 40:27, 32:27, and 27:16; or G↓, E♭↓, and A↑), even though they do not completely meet the conditions to be wolf intervals, deviate from the corresponding pure ratio by an amount (1 syntonic comma, i.e., 81:80, or about 21.5 cents) large enough to be clearly perceived as dissonant.

Five-limit tuning determines one diminished sixth of size 1024:675 (about 722 cents, i.e. 20 cents sharper than the 3:2 Pythagorean perfect fifth). Whether this interval should be considered dissonant enough to be called a wolf fifth is a controversial matter.

Five-limit tuning also creates two impure perfect fifths of size 40:27. Five-limit fifths are about 680 cents; less pure than the 3:2 Pythagorean and/or just 701.95500 cent perfect fifth . They are not diminished sixths, but relative to the Pythagorean perfect fifth they are less consonant (about 20 cents flatter) and hence, they might be considered to be wolf fifths. The corresponding inversion is an impure perfect fourth (also called Acute Fourth) of size 27:20 (about 520 cents). For instance, in the C major diatonic scale, an impure perfect fifth arises between D and A, and its inversion arises between A and D.

Since in this context the term perfect is interpreted to mean 'perfectly consonant', the impure perfect fourth and perfect fifth are sometimes simply called the imperfect fourth and fifth. However, the widely adopted standard naming convention for musical intervals classifies them as perfect intervals, together with the octave and unison. This is also true for any perfect fourth or perfect fifth which slightly deviates from the perfectly consonant 4:3 or 3:2 ratios. For instance, those tuned using 12 tone equal or quarter-comma meantone temperament. Conversely, the expressions imperfect fourth and imperfect fifth do not conflict with the standard naming convention when they refer to a dissonant augmented third or diminished sixth, e.g. the wolf fourth and fifth in Pythagorean tuning.

== Practical solutions ==
Wolf intervals are a consequence of mapping a two-dimensional temperament to a one-dimensional keyboard. The only solution is to make the number of dimensions match. That is, either:

- Keep the (one-dimensional) piano keyboard, and shift to a one-dimensional temperament (e.g., equal temperament), or
- Keep the two-dimensional temperament, and shift to a two-dimensional keyboard.

=== Keep the piano keyboard ===
When the perfect fifth is tempered to be exactly 700 cents wide (that is, tempered by about 1/11 of a syntonic comma, or precisely 1/12 of a Pythagorean comma) then the tuning is identical to the now-standard 12 tone equal temperament.

Because of the compromises (and wolf intervals) forced on meantone tunings by the one-dimensional piano-style keyboard, well temperaments and eventually 12-tone equal temperament became more popular.

A fifth of the size Mozart favored, at or near the 55 equal temperament fifth of 698.182 cents, will have a wolf of 720 cents: 18.045 cents sharper than a justly tuned fifth. This howls far less acutely, but is still noticeable.

The wolf can be "tamed" by adopting equal temperament or a well temperament. The very intrepid may simply want to treat it as a xenharmonic music interval; depending on the size of the meantone fifth, the wolf fifth can be tuned to more complex just ratios 20:13, 26:17, 17:11, 32:21, or 49:32.

With a more extreme meantone temperament, like 19 equal temperament, the wolf is large enough that it is closer in size to a sixth than a fifth, and sounds like a different interval altogether rather than a mistuned fifth. (In 19 equal temperament, the diminished sixth is enharmonically equivalent to the augmented fifth.)

=== Keep the two-dimensional tuning system ===
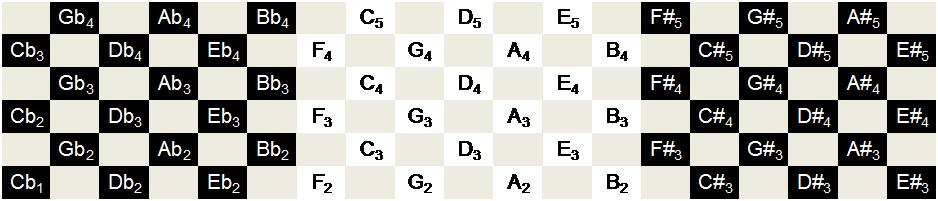
Figure 1: The Wicki isomorphic keyboard, invented by Kaspar Wicki in 1896.

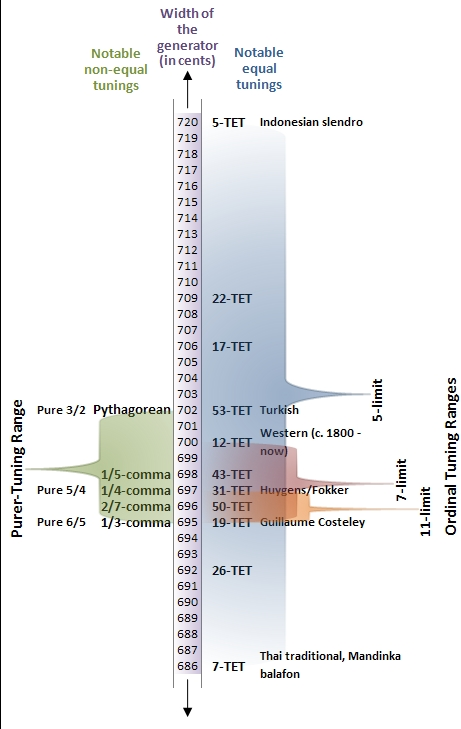
Figure 2: The syntonic temperament’s tuning continuum.

A lesser-known alternative method that allows the use of multi-dimensional temperaments without wolf intervals is to use a two-dimensional keyboard that is "isomorphic" with that temperament. A keyboard and temperament are isomorphic if they are generated by the same intervals. For example, the Wicki keyboard shown in Figure 1 is generated by the same musical intervals as the syntonic temperament—that is, by the octave and tempered perfect fifth—so they are isomorphic.

On an isomorphic keyboard, any given musical interval has the same shape wherever it appears—in any octave, key, and tuning—except at the edges. For example, on Wicki's keyboard, from any given note, the note that is a tempered perfect fifth higher is always up-and-rightwardly adjacent to the given note. There are no wolf intervals within the note-span of this keyboard. The only problem is at the edge, on the note E♯.

The note that is a tempered perfect fifth higher than E♯ is B♯, which is not included on the keyboard shown, although it could be included in a larger keyboard, placed just to the right of A♯, hence maintaining the keyboard's consistent note-pattern. Because there is no B♯ button, when playing an E♯ power chord, one must choose some other note that is close in pitch to B♯, such as C, to play instead of the missing B♯. That is, the interval from E♯ to C would be a "wolf interval" on this keyboard. In 19-TET, the interval from E♯ to C♭ would be (enharmonic to) a perfect fifth.

Such edge conditions produce wolf intervals only if the isomorphic keyboard has fewer buttons per octave than the tuning has enharmonically distinct notes. For example, the isomorphic keyboard in Figure 2 has 19 buttons per octave, so the above-cited edge condition, from E♯ to C, is not a wolf interval in 12-TET, 17-TET, or 19-TET; however, it is a wolf interval in 26-TET, 31-TET, and 53-TET. In these latter tunings, using electronic transposition could keep the current key's notes centered on the isomorphic keyboard, in which case these wolf intervals would very rarely be encountered in tonal music, despite modulation to exotic keys.

A keyboard that is isomorphic with the syntonic temperament, such as Wicki's keyboard above, retains its isomorphism in any tuning within the tuning continuum of the syntonic temperament, even when changing tuning dynamically among such tunings. Plamondon, Milne & Sethares (2009), Figure 2, shows the valid tuning range of the syntonic temperament.

== Audio files ==
- Wolf fifth on C.
- A mean fifth followed by a wolf fifth in quarter-comma meantone temperament
