= Diminished second =

diminished second
- Inverse: augmented seventh

Name
- Other names: —
- Abbreviation: d2

Size
- Semitones: 0
- Interval class: 0
- Just interval: 128:125, 524288:531441 (Pythagorean tuning)

Cents
- Equal temperament: 0
- Just intonation: 41.1, -23.46

In modern Western tonal music theory, a diminished second is the interval produced by narrowing a minor second by one chromatic semitone. In twelve-tone equal temperament, it is enharmonically equivalent to a perfect unison; therefore, it is the interval between notes on two adjacent staff positions, or having adjacent note letters, altered in such a way that they have no pitch difference in twelve-tone equal temperament. An example is the interval from a B to the C♭ immediately above; another is the interval from a B♯ to the C immediately above.

In particular, it may be regarded as the "difference" between a diatonic and chromatic semitone. For instance, the interval from B to C is a diatonic semitone, the interval from B to B♯ is a chromatic semitone, and their difference, the interval from B♯ to C is a diminished second.

Being diminished, it is considered a dissonant interval.

== Size in different tuning systems ==
In tuning systems other than 12-tone equal temperament and its multiples, the diminished second is a distinct interval. It can be viewed as a comma, the minute interval between two enharmonically equivalent notes tuned in a slightly different way. This makes it a highly variable quantity between tuning systems. Hence for example C♯ is narrower (or sometimes wider) than D♭ by a diminished second interval, however large or small that may happen to be (see image below).

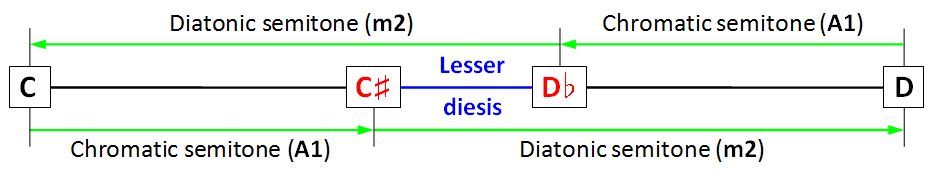
Diminished second in quarter-comma meantone (also known as lesser diesis), coinciding with the interval from C♯ to D♭, defined as the difference between m2 and A1 (117.1 − 76.0 = 41.1 cents).

In 12-tone equal temperament, the diminished second is identical to the unison, because the chromatic and diatonic semitones have the same size. In 19-tone equal temperament, which extends 1/3-comma meantone, it is identical to the chromatic semitone and is a respectable 63.16 cents wide. The most commonly used meantone temperaments fall between these extremes, giving it an intermediate size.

However, in 53-tone equal temperament, which extends Pythagorean tuning, the interval actually shows a descending direction, i.e. a ratio below unison, and thus a negative size, going one step down. In general, this applies for all tunings with fifths wider than 700 cents.

The table below summarizes the definitions of the diminished second in the main tuning systems. In the column labeled "Difference between semitones", m2 is the minor second (diatonic semitone), A1 is the augmented unison (chromatic semitone), and S_{1}, S_{2}, S_{3}, S_{4} are semitones as defined in five-limit tuning#Size of intervals. Notice that for 5-limit tuning, 1/6-, 1/5-, 1/4-, and 1/3-comma meantone, the diminished second coincides with the corresponding commas.

Tuning system	Definition of diminished second		Size	
Tuning system	Difference between semitones	Equivalent to	Cents	Ratio
Pythagorean tuning	m2 − A1	Opposite of Pythagorean comma	−23.46	524288:531441
1/12-comma meantone	m2 − A1	Opposite of schisma	−1.95	32768:32805
12-tone equal temperament	m2 − A1	Unison	0.00	1:1
1/6-comma meantone	m2 − A1	Diaschisma	19.55	2048:2025
5-limit tuning	S_{3} − S_{2}	Diaschisma	19.55	2048:2025
1/5-comma meantone	m2 − A1		28.16	$\frac{512}{225}\sqrt[5]{\frac{4}{225}}$
1/4-comma meantone	m2 − A1	(Lesser) diesis	41.06	128:125
5-limit tuning	S_{3} − S_{1}	(Lesser) diesis	41.06	128:125
1/3-comma meantone	m2 − A1	Greater diesis	62.57	648:625
5-limit tuning	S_{4} − S_{1}	Greater diesis	62.57	648:625
19-tone equal temperament	m2 − A1	Chromatic semitone (A1 = m2 / 2)	63.16	$\sqrt[19]{2}$:1
31-tone equal temperament	m2 − A1	Lesser diesis	38.77	$\sqrt[31]{2}$:1

== See also ==
- List of musical intervals
- List of pitch intervals
- List of meantone intervals
- Comma (music)
