= Semitone =

Basic musical interval

A diatonic semitone, or minor second

In Western music theory, a semitone (also called a half step or half tone) is one of the two parts into which a whole tone is divided. Semitones are the smallest intervals commonly harmonically and melodically used in Western music, and are among the most dissonant intervals when sounded harmonically. A sequence of twelve semitones forms a chromatic scale, which informs the layout of many fixed-pitch instruments. For example, C is adjacent to D♭ on a keyboard, so the interval between them is a semitone.

In musical notation, two types of semitones are distinguished. A diatonic semitone, or minor second, arises between two notes encompassing different staff positions, e.g. from C to D♭. A chromatic semitone, or augmented unison, arises between two notes at the same staff position, e.g. from D♭ to D♮. The sum of these two intervals, the interval from C to D, is a whole tone, or major second.

The modern tuning system of 12-tone equal temperament divides the octave into twelve equal semitones, each with a frequency ratio of the twelfth root of two (100 cents). In this system, a given interval can be represented by a specific number of semitones from any starting note. For example, two semitones may represent a major second, four semitones a major third, and seven semitones a perfect fifth.

In tuning systems derived from stacking perfect fifths, i.e. Pythagorean tuning and the related meantone temperaments, diatonic semitones all have the same size, as do chromatic semitones, but the two sizes are distinct. (Note: Excluding 12-tone equal temperament, which is technically also a meantone temperament) For example, they are not the same size in Pythagorean tuning, where the diatonic semitone is distinguished from the larger chromatic semitone, or in quarter-comma meantone temperament, where the diatonic semitone is larger instead.

The condition of having semitones is called hemitonia; that of having no semitones is anhemitonia. A musical scale or chord containing semitones is called hemitonic; one without semitones is anhemitonic.

== Minor second ==
Minor second
- Inverse: Major seventh

Name
- Abbreviation: m2, -2

Tuning
- 12 equal temperament: 1 semitone (100 cents)
- Pythagorean tuning: 256:243 (90.2 cents)
- 5-limit tuning: 16:15 (111.7 cents), 27:25 (133.2 cents), ...

The minor second (m2 or -2) occurs in the major scale, between the third and fourth degree, (mi (E) and fa (F) in C major), and between the seventh and eighth degree (ti (B) and do (C) in C major). It is also called the diatonic semitone because it occurs between steps in the diatonic scale. Its inversion is the major seventh (M7 or Ma7).

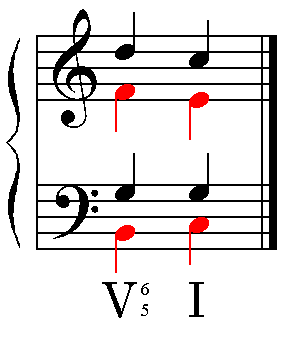
Melodic minor seconds in an imperfect authentic cadence. The melodic minor second is an integral part of most cadences of the Common practice period.

Melodically, this interval is very frequently used, and is of particular importance in cadences. In the authentic and deceptive cadences it appears as a resolution of the leading tone to the tonic. In the plagal cadence, it appears as the falling of the subdominant to the mediant. It also occurs in many forms of the imperfect cadence, wherever the tonic falls to the leading tone.

Harmonically, the interval usually occurs as some form of dissonance or a nonchord tone that is not part of the functional harmony. It may also appear in inversions of a major seventh chord, and in many added tone chords.

Harmonic minor second in J. S. Bach's Prelude in C major from the WTC, book 1, mm. 7–9.
The minor second may be viewed as a suspension of the B resolving into the following A minor seventh chord.

Frédéric Chopin's "wrong note" Étude
Étude Op. 25, No. 5
Martha Goldstein playing on an Érard (1851)
Opening bars

In unusual situations, the minor second can add a great deal of character to the music. For instance, Frédéric Chopin's Étude Op. 25, No. 5 opens with a melody accompanied by a line that plays fleeting minor seconds. These are used to humorous and whimsical effect, which contrasts with its more lyrical middle section. This eccentric dissonance has earned the piece its nickname: the "wrong note" étude. This kind of usage of the minor second appears in many other works of the Romantic period, such as Modest Mussorgsky's "Ballet of the Unhatched Chicks" from Pictures at an Exhibition. More recently, the music to the movie Jaws exemplifies the minor second.

== Augmented unison ==
Augmented unison
- Inverse: Diminished octave

Name
- Other names: Chromatic semitone, minor semitone
- Abbreviation: A1

Tuning
- 12 equal temperament: 1 semitone (100 cents)
- Pythagorean tuning: 2187:2048 (114 cents)
- 5-limit tuning: 25:24 (71 cents), ...

The augmented unison, augmented prime, or chromatic semitone is the interval between two notes on the same staff position (same letter name) that differ by one chromatic alteration. For example, the interval between B♭ and B♮, or between C♮ and C♯, is an augmented unison.

The term, in its French form unisson superflu, appears to have been coined by Jean-Philippe Rameau in 1722, who also called this interval a minor semitone (semiton mineur). Historically, this interval, like the tritone, is described as being "mi contra fa" and was associated with the "diabolus in musica" (Latin for 'the Devil in music').

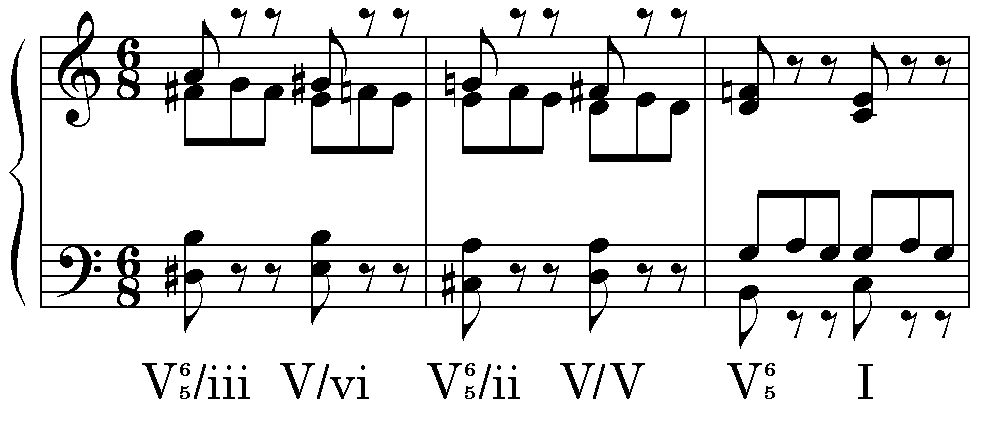
Augmented unisons often appear as a consequence of secondary dominants, such as those in the soprano voice of this sequence from Felix Mendelssohn's Song Without Words Op. 102 No. 3, mm. 47–49.

Melodically, an augmented unison very frequently occurs when proceeding to a chromatic chord, such as a secondary dominant, a diminished seventh chord, or an augmented sixth chord. Its use is also often the consequence of a melody proceeding in semitones, regardless of harmonic underpinning, e.g. D, D♯, E, F, F♯. (Restricting the notation to only minor seconds is impractical, as the same example would have a rapidly increasing number of accidentals, written enharmonically as D, E♭, F♭, G, A).

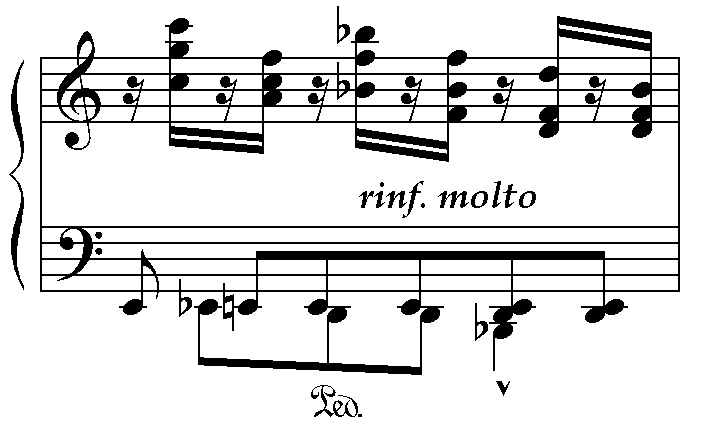
Franz Liszt's second Transcendental Étude, measure 63

Harmonically, augmented unisons are quite rare in tonal repertoire. In the example to the right, Liszt wrote an E♭ against an E♮ in the bass. Here E♭ was preferred to a D♯ to make the tone's function clear as part of an F dominant seventh chord, and the augmented unison is the result of superimposing this harmony upon an E pedal point.

In addition to this kind of usage, harmonic augmented unisons are frequently written in modern works involving tone clusters, such as Iannis Xenakis' Evryali for solo piano.

=== Diminished unison ===
The term diminished unison or diminished prime is also found occasionally. It is found once in Rameau's writings, for example, as well as subsequent French, German, and English sources. (Note: Sources for diminished unison: Johann Georg Albrechtsberger, Methods of Harmony, Figured Base, and Composition: Adapted for Self-Instruction, Volume 1, edited by Ignaz Seyfried (Ritter von), and Alexandre Choron (London: R. Cocks & Co., 1834): 4 [Translated from Méthodes d'harmonie et de composition: à l'aide desquelles on peut apprendre soi-même à accompagner la basse chiffrée et à composer toute espèce de musique, par J.-Georges Albrechtsberger. Nouvelle éd., mise en ordre et considérablement augmentée d'après l'enseignement de l'auteur, et formant la collection complète de ses OEuvres de théorie musicale, par le chevalier de Seyfried, son élève. Traduite de l'allemand, avec des notes, par M. Choron. Paris: Bachelier, 1830.]; Henry Charles Banister, A Text-book of Music (London: George Bell and Sons, 1872): 34.; Alexandre Choron, Principes de Composition des Ecoles d'Italie: Adoptés par le Gouvernement Français pour servir à l'instruction des Elèves des Maîtrises de Cathédrales: ouvrage classique formé de la réunion des modèles les plus parfaits en tout genre, enrichi d'un texte méthodique rédigé selon l'enseignement des Ecoles les plus célèbres et des Ecrivains didactiques les plus estimés, Tome premier, Contenant la préface & les Trois premiers Livres (Paris, 1808): 2; Castil-Blaze [François-Henri-Joseph Blaze], Dictionnaire de musique moderne (Brussels: L'Academie de musique, 1828): 269.; Anton Gräffer, Systematische Guitarre-Schule, Erster Theil (Vienna: Anton Strauß, 1811): 38.; Oskar Kolbe, Kurzgefasste Generalbasslehre, second, enlarged and corrected edition (Leipzig: Breitkopf und Härtel, 1872): 12.; Alexander Lehr, Campanology Textbook: The Musical and Technical Aspect of Swinging Bells and Carillons, constituting Bulletin of the Guild of Carillonneurs in North America Volume 54 (2005): 51. The Guild of Carillonneurs in North America.; Horst Leuchtmann, Dictionary of Terms in Music / Wörterbuch Musik: English–German, German–English, fourth, revised and enlarged edition (Munich, London, New York, and Paris: K. G. Saur; Berlin: Walter De Gruyter, 1992): 324. ISBN 978-3-598-10913-3 (cloth); ISBN 978-3-11-190694-2 (print/ebook); ISBN 978-3-11-150573-2 (ebook).; Frederic Allison Lyman, The Normal Music Course in the Schoolroom: Being a Practical Exposition of the Normal Music Course, Together with Its Complemental Series, The Cecilian Series of Study and Song, by John W. Tufts, Designed to Aid Those who Teach Vocal Music (Boston, New York, Chicago: Silver, Burdett, and Company, 1896): 47–48.; Robert Middleton, Harmony in Modern Counterpoint (Boston: Allyn and Bacon, 1967): 20.; Cesar-Auguste Monti-Punti, Les secrets de la musique ou théorie musicale, edited by Pierre Rigaud (Paris: Leduc, 1846): 63, 72, 77.; Robert Nelson and Carl J. Christensen, Foundations of Music, seventh edition (Boston: Schirmer Cengage Learning, 2008): 169. ISBN 978-0-495-56593-2.; Gustav Schilling, Musikalische Didaktik; oder, Die Kunst des Unterrichts in der Musik: Ein nothwendiges Hand- und Hülfsbuch für alle lehrer und lernende der Musik, Erzieher, Schulvorsteher, Organisten, Volkschullehrer &c. (Eisleben: Ferdinand Kuhnt. 1851): 315.; Daniel Gottlob Türk, Anweisung zum Generalbaßspielen, second edition (Halle: Hemmerde und Schwetschte; Leipzig: Schwickert, 1800): 16.; William Alfred White (1907). Harmony and Ear-Training (New York, Boston [etc.]: Silver, Burdett & Company): 35.) Other sources reject the possibility or utility of the diminished unison on the grounds that any alteration to the unison increases its size, thus augmenting rather than diminishing it. (Note: Sources for augmented unison: Friedrich Wilhelm Marpurg, Anfangsgründe der theoretischen Musik (Leipzig: Johann Gottlieb Immanuel Breitkopf, 1757): 34.; Friedrich Wilhelm Marpurg, Handbuch bey dem Generalbasse und der Composition: mit zwo- drey- vier- fünf- sechs- sieben- acht und mehreren Stimmen für Anfänger und Geübtere, second, expanded and corrected edition (Berlin: Gottlieb August Lange. 1762): 14.; Stefan Kostka and Dorothy Payne (2004). Tonal Harmony (Boston: McGraw-Hill): 21. ISBN 978-0-07-285260-8. "There is no such thing as a diminished unison."; Michael Pilhofer and Holly Day (2006). Music Theory for Dummies (Hoboken, NJ: John Wiley & Sons, Inc.): 113. ISBN 978-0-7645-7838-0. "There is no such thing as a diminished unison, because no matter how you change the unisons with accidentals, you are adding half steps to the total interval."; Andrew Surmani, Karen Farnum Surmani, and Morton Manus (2009). Alfred's Essentials of Music Theory: A Complete Self-Study Course for All Musicians ([s.l.]: Alfred Music Publishing): 135. ISBN 0-7390-3635-1. "Since lowering either note of a perfect unison would actually increase its size, the perfect unison cannot be diminished, only augmented."; W. S. B. Mathews (1909). "Editorial: Prof. White's Harmony and Ear-Training", The Journal of School Music 1, no. 9 (June): 260–63. Citation on 263: "What he [Prof. White in Harmony and Ear Training] calls the 'diminished prime or unison' cannot possibly occur. It is simply an augmented unison. Because unison is 'the relation of two tones at the same pitch,' and when one of these is chromatically distanced, it creates the contradiction in terms known as 'augmented' unison; but the other term, 'diminished unison' is impossible on the face of it, because the 'same pitch' cannot be made less."; Smith, Uselma Clarke (1916). Keyboard Harmony, p. 15. The Boston Music Company. "Note that the diminished unison and octave are not commonly used."; Jim Aikin (2004). A Player's Guide to Chords & Harmony (San Francisco: Backbeat Books): 32. ISBN 978-0-87930-798-1. "In case you were wondering, there's no such thing as a diminished unison."; Arthur Foote and Walter Raymond Spalding (1905). Modern Harmony in Its Theory and Practice, p. 5. Arthur P. Schmidt. "a diminished unison is unthinkable, and the diminished 2d and 9th are of no practical use:...") The term is sometimes justified as a negative-numbered interval, and also in terms of violin double-stopping technique on analogy to parallel intervals found on other strings. Some theoreticians make a distinction for this diminished form of the unison, stating it is only valid as a melodic interval, not a harmonic one. (Note: Source for melodic interval: Nicolas Etienne Framery, Pierre Louis Ginguené, and Jérôme-Joseph Momigny. Encyclopédie méthodique: musique, 2 vols. (Paris: Mme. Veuve Agasse,1818): 2:19.; Carl Edward Gardner, Essentials of Music Theory: Elementary (New York: Carl Fischer, Inc. 1912): 34.; Johann Adam Hiller (ed.) "Fortsetzung zu dem musikalischen Wörterbuche", Wöchentliche Nachrichten und Anmerkungen, die Musik betreffend 3, no. 41 (10 April 1769): 315–22, citation on 318.; E. Friedrich Richter, Traité de l'harmonie: théorique et pratique, translated from the German by Gustave Sandré (Leipzig and Brussels: Breitkopf & Härtel, Éditeurs, 1891): 3.)

== History ==
The semitone appeared in the music theory of Greek antiquity as part of a diatonic or chromatic tetrachord, and it has always had a place in the diatonic scales of Western music since. The various modal scales of medieval music theory were all based upon this diatonic pattern of tones and semitones.

Though it would later become an integral part of the musical cadence, in the early polyphony of the 11th century this was not the case. Guido of Arezzo suggested instead in his Micrologus other alternatives: either proceeding by whole tone from a major second to a unison, or an occursus having two notes at a major third move by contrary motion toward a unison, each having moved a whole tone.

"As late as the 13th century the half step was experienced as a problematic interval not easily understood, as the irrational [sic] remainder between the perfect fourth and the ditone
$$\left(\begin{matrix} \frac{4}{3} \end{matrix} / {{\begin{matrix} (\frac{9}{8}) \end{matrix}}^2} = \begin{matrix} \frac{256}{243} \end{matrix}\right)$$
." In a melodic half step, no "tendency was perceived of the lower tone toward the upper, or of the upper toward the lower. The second tone was not taken to be the 'goal' of the first. Instead, the half step was avoided in clausulae because it lacked clarity as an interval."

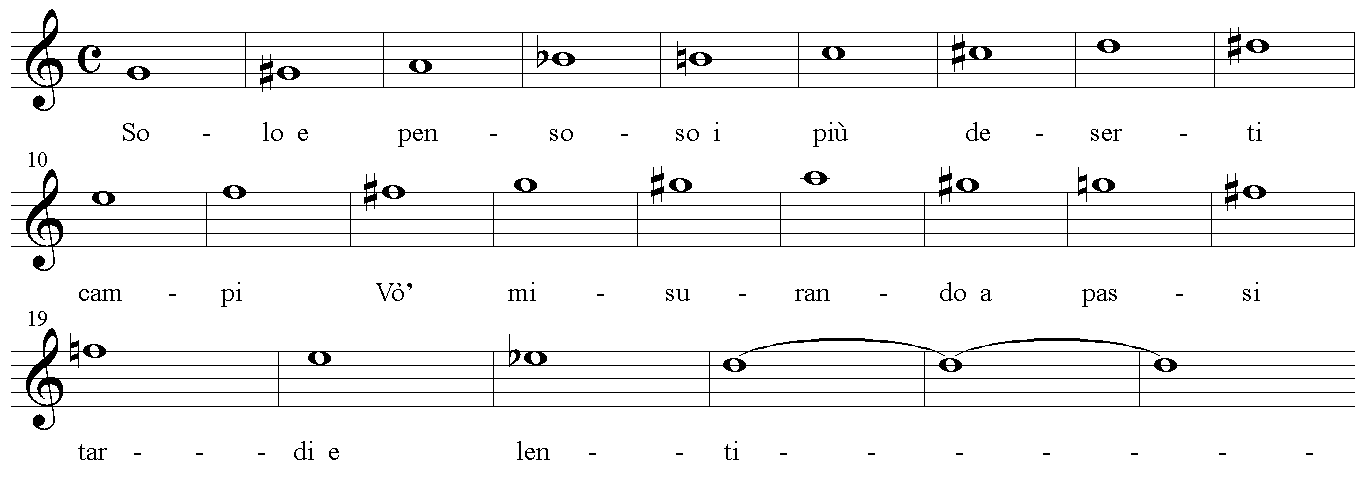
Dramatic chromatic scale in the opening measures of Luca Marenzio's Solo e pensoso, ca. 1580

However, beginning in the 13th century cadences begin to require motion in one voice by half step and the other a whole step in contrary motion. These cadences would become a fundamental part of the musical language, even to the point where the usual accidental accompanying the minor second in a cadence was often omitted from the written score (a practice known as musica ficta). By the 16th century, the semitone had become a more versatile interval, sometimes even appearing as an augmented unison in very chromatic passages. Semantically, in the 16th century the repeated melodic semitone became associated with weeping, see: passus duriusculus, lament bass, and pianto.

By the Baroque era (1600 to 1750), the tonal harmonic framework was fully formed, and the various musical functions of the semitone were rigorously understood. Later in this period the adoption of well temperaments for instrumental tuning and the more frequent use of enharmonic equivalences increased the ease with which a semitone could be applied. Its function remained similar through the Classical period, and though it was used more frequently as the language of tonality became more chromatic in the Romantic period, the musical function of the semitone did not change.

In the 20th century, however, composers such as Arnold Schoenberg, Béla Bartók, and Igor Stravinsky sought alternatives or extensions of tonal harmony, and found other uses for the semitone. Often the semitone was exploited harmonically as a caustic dissonance, having no resolution. Some composers would even use large collections of harmonic semitones (tone clusters) as a source of cacophony in their music (e.g. the early piano works of Henry Cowell). By now, enharmonic equivalence was a commonplace property of equal temperament, and instrumental use of the semitone was not at all problematic for the performer. The composer was free to write semitones wherever he wished.

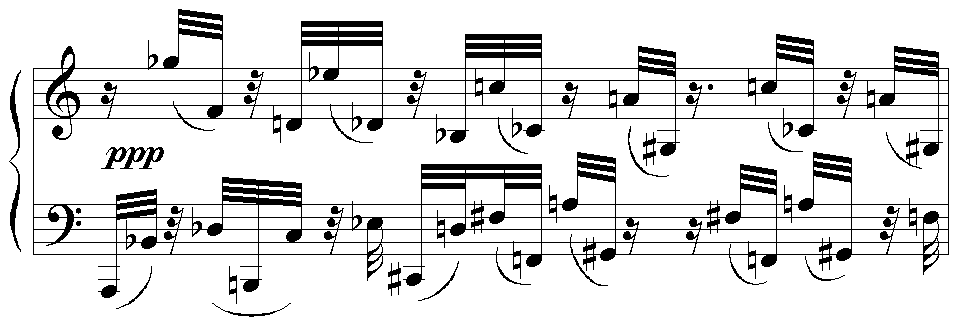
This excerpt from the first of Arnold Schoenberg's Three Piano Pieces, Op. 11 (m. 40) demonstrates completely unrestrained use of the semitone and related intervals.

== Semitones in different tunings ==
The exact size of a semitone depends on the tuning system used. Pythagorean tuning has two distinct types of semitones. Meantone temperaments have two distinct types of semitones, but in the exceptional case of 12-tone equal temperament, there is only one. The unevenly distributed well temperaments contain many different semitones. In systems of just intonation, several types of semitones are encountered.

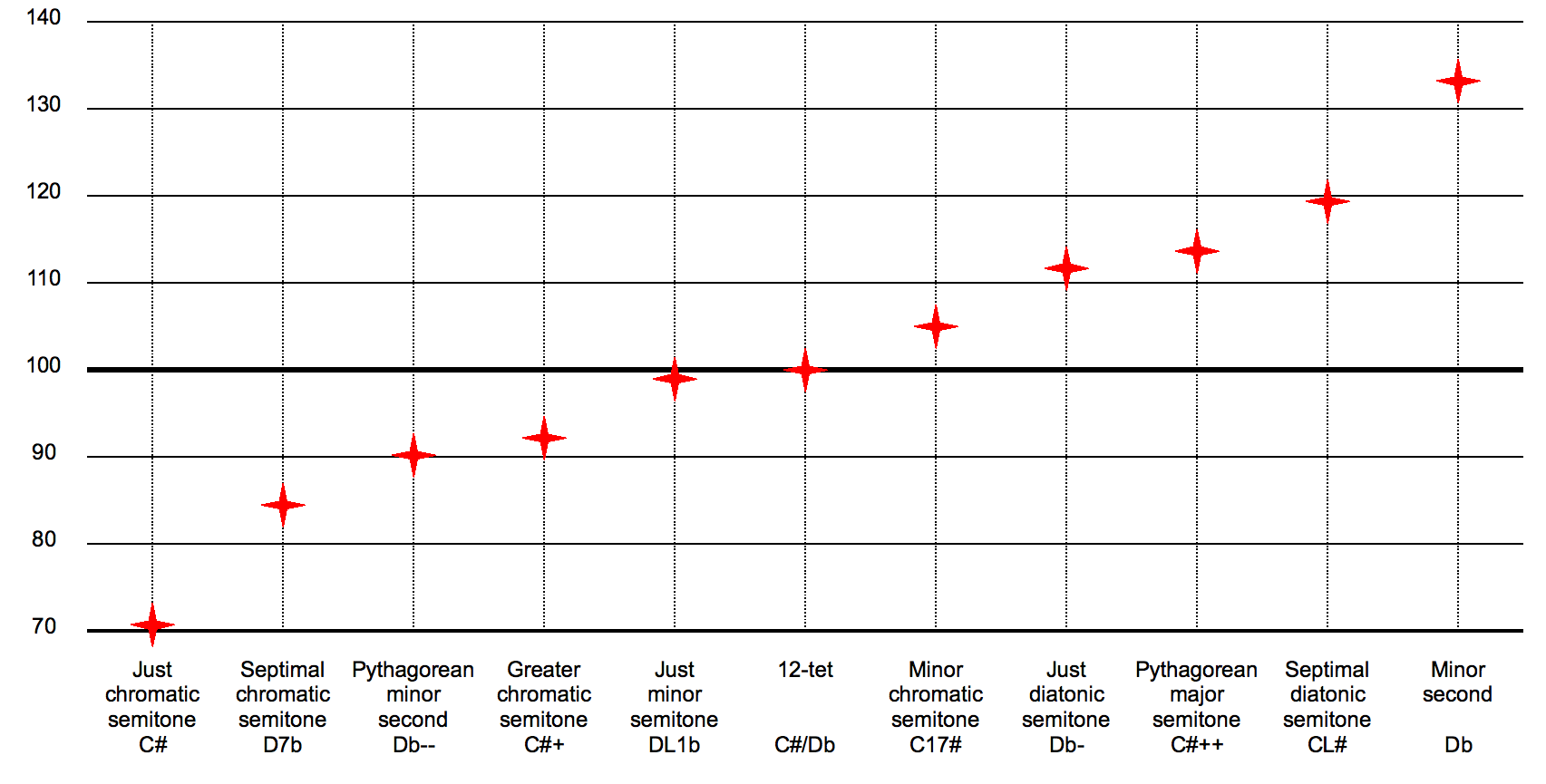

=== Pythagorean tuning ===
Pythagorean tuning, or 3-limit just intonation, is generated by a sequence of perfect fifths, which creates two distinct semitones.

Pythagorean limma on C	Pythagorean apotome on C
As five descending fifths from C (the inverse is B)	As seven ascending fifths from C (the inverse is C♭)

The Pythagorean diatonic semitone has a ratio of 256/243, and is often called the Pythagorean limma. It is also sometimes called the Pythagorean minor semitone. It is about 90.2 cents.

$$\frac{256}{243} = \frac{2^8}{3^5} = \frac{2^3}{(3/2)^5} \approx 90.2 \text{ cents}$$

It can be thought of as the difference between three octaves and five just fifths, and functions as a diatonic semitone.

The Pythagorean chromatic semitone has a ratio of 2187/2048. It is about 113.7 cents. It may also be called the Pythagorean apotome or the Pythagorean major semitone. (See Pythagorean interval.)

$$\frac{2187}{2048} = \frac{3^7}{2^{11}} = \frac{(3/2)^7}{2^4} \approx 113.7\text{ cents}$$

It can be thought of as the difference between four perfect octaves and seven just fifths, and functions as a chromatic semitone.

The Pythagorean limma and Pythagorean apotome are only a Pythagorean comma apart, and may be considered enharmonic equivalents, in contrast to the diatonic and chromatic semitones in meantone temperament and 5-limit just intonation, which are farther apart.

=== Meantone temperament ===
Meantone temperaments are generated by a sequence of tempered perfect fifths of the same size, similarly to Pythagorean tuning, where the perfect fifths are pure instead. Likewise, the diatonic and chromatic semitones depend on the size of the fifth, where the diatonic semitone is derived by descending 5 fifths, and the chromatic semitone is derived by ascending 7 fifths. These are typically of different sizes, with the exception of 12 equal temperament, discussed below. Unlike in Pythagorean tuning, the chromatic semitone is usually smaller than the diatonic.

In the common quarter-comma meantone, the chromatic and diatonic semitones are 76.0 and 117.1 cents wide respectively. They differ by the lesser diesis of ratio 128:125 or 41.1 cents.

Quarter-comma meantone is largely used to create a 12-tone tuning, usually via a sequence of fifths from E♭ to G♯. There is a break in the circle of fifths in this tuning; the interval between G♯ and E♭ does not represent a perfect fifth, but rather a diminished sixth. Such intervals are referred to as wolf intervals. Ascending by a semitone from an arbitrary pitch, the resulting interval depends on this break: diatonic semitones derive from a descending chain of 5 fifths that does not cross the break, and chromatic semitones come from one that does, where the note is instead derived by an ascending chain of 7 fifths.

Chromatic semitone	76.0				76.0			76.0			76.0				76.0		
Pitch	C	C♯	D		E♭	E		F	F♯		G	G♯	A		B♭	B	C
Cents	0.0	76.0	193.2		310.3	386.3		503.4	579.5		696.6	772.6	889.7		1006.8	1082.9	1200.0
Diatonic semitone			117.1	117.1			117.1			117.1			117.1	117.1			117.1

Extended tunings with more than 12 notes still retain the same two semitone sizes, but there is more flexibility for the musician about whether to use an augmented unison or minor second. 31-tone equal temperament is the most flexible of these, which makes an unbroken circle of 31 fifths, allowing the choice of semitone to be made for any pitch.

=== Equal temperament ===
12-tone equal temperament is a form of meantone tuning in which the diatonic and chromatic semitones are exactly the same. Each semitone is equal to one twelfth of an octave. This is a ratio of 2^{1/12} (approximately 1.05946), or 100 cents, and is 11.7 cents narrower than the 16:15 ratio (its most common form in just intonation, discussed below).

There are many approximations, rational or otherwise, to the equal-tempered semitone. To cite a few:

- $18 / 17 \approx 99.0 \text{ cents,}$
  suggested by Vincenzo Galilei and used by luthiers of the Renaissance,

- $\sqrt[4]{\frac{2}{3-\sqrt{2}}} \approx 100.4 \text{ cents,}$
  suggested by Marin Mersenne as a constructible and more accurate alternative,

- $(139 / 138 )^8 \approx 99.9995 \text{ cents,}$
  used by Julián Carrillo as part of a sixteenth-tone system.

=== Well temperament ===
There are many forms of well temperament, but the characteristic they all share is that their semitones are of an uneven size. Every semitone in a well temperament has its own interval (usually close to the equal-tempered version of 100 cents), and there is no clear distinction between a diatonic and chromatic semitone in the tuning. Well temperament was constructed so that enharmonic equivalence could be assumed between all of these semitones, and whether they were written as a minor second or augmented unison did not effect a different sound. Instead, in these systems, each key had a slightly different sonic color or character, beyond the limitations of conventional notation.

=== 5-limit just intonation ===
16:15 diatonic semitone
16:15 diatonic semitone
'Larger' or major limma on C

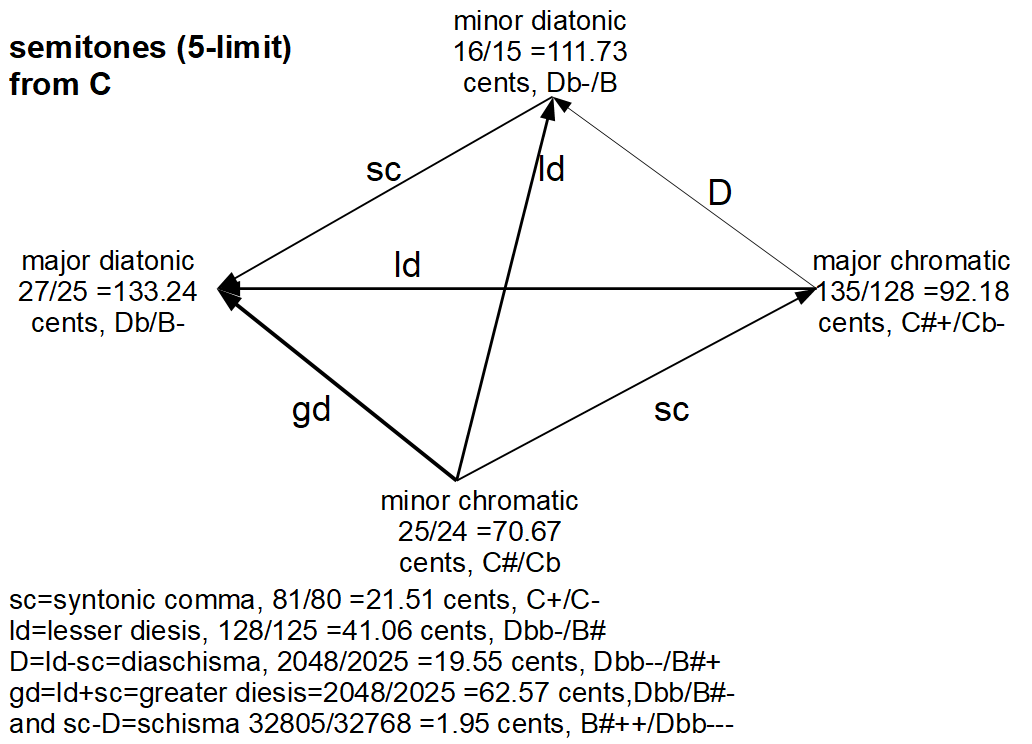
Relationship between the 4 common 5 limit semitones

A minor second in just intonation typically corresponds to a pitch ratio of 16:15 or 1.0666... (approximately 111.7 cents), called the just diatonic semitone. This is a practical just semitone, since it is the interval that occurs twice within the diatonic scale between a:

major third (5:4) and perfect fourth (4:3) $\ \left(\ \tfrac{4}{3} \div \tfrac{5}{4} = \tfrac{16}{15}\ \right)\ ,$ and a
major seventh (15:8) and the perfect octave (2:1) $\ \left(\ \tfrac{2}{1} \div \tfrac{15}{8} = \tfrac{16}{15}\ \right) ~.$

The 16:15 just minor second arises in Ptolemy's intense diatonic scale. Given a major scale starting on C, it occurs between B & C and E & F, and is "the sharpest dissonance found in the scale".

An "augmented unison" (sharp) in just intonation is a different, smaller semitone, with frequency ratio 25:24 or 1.0416... (approximately 70.7 cents). It is the interval between a major third (5:4) and a minor third (6:5). In fact, it is the spacing between the minor and major thirds, sixths, and sevenths (but not necessarily the major and minor second). Composer Ben Johnston used the sharp (♯) and flat (♭) symbols to indicate a note is raised or lowered by this interval.

Two other kinds of semitones are produced by 5 limit tuning. A chromatic scale defines 12 semitones as the 12 intervals between the 13 adjacent notes, spanning a full octave (e.g. from C_{4} to C_{5}). The 12 semitones produced by a commonly used version of 5 limit tuning have four different sizes, and can be classified as follows:

Just chromatic semitone
chromatic semitone, or smaller, or minor chromatic semitone between harmonically related flats and sharps e.g. between E♭ and E (6:5 and 5:4):
$$S_1 = \tfrac{5}{4} \div \tfrac{6}{5} = \tfrac{25}{24} \approx 70.7 \ \hbox{cents}$$
Larger chromatic semitone
or major chromatic semitone, or larger limma, or major chroma, e.g. between C and an accute C♯ (C♯ raised by a syntonic comma) (1:1 and 135:128):
$$S_2 = \tfrac{25}{24} \times \tfrac{81}{80} = \tfrac{135}{128} \approx 92.2 \ \hbox{cents}$$
Just diatonic semitone
or smaller, or minor diatonic semitone, e.g. between E and F (5:4 to 4:3):
$$S_3 = \tfrac{4}{3} \div \tfrac{5}{4} = \tfrac{16}{15} \approx 111.7 \ \hbox{cents}$$
Larger diatonic semitone
or greater or major diatonic semitone, e.g. between A and B♭ (5:3 to 9:5), or C and chromatic D♭ (27:25), or F♯ and G (25:18 and 3:2):
$$S_4 = \tfrac{9}{5} \div \tfrac{5}{3} = \tfrac{27}{25} \approx 133.2 \ \hbox{cents}$$

The most frequently occurring semitones are the just ones (S_{3}, 16:15, and S_{1}, 25:24): S_{3} occurs at 6 short intervals out of 12, S_{1} 3 times, S_{2} twice, and S_{4} at only one interval (if diatonic D♭ replaces chromatic D♭ and sharp notes are not used).

The smaller chromatic and diatonic semitones differ from the larger by the syntonic comma (81:80 or 21.5 cents). The smaller and larger chromatic semitones differ from the respective diatonic semitones by the same 128:125 diesis as the above meantone semitones. Finally, while the inner semitones differ by the diaschisma (2048:2025 or 19.6 cents), the outer differ by the greater diesis (648:625 or 62.6 cents).

=== Extended just intonation ===
In 7 limit tuning there is the septimal diatonic semitone of 15:14 available in between the 5 limit major seventh (15:8) and the 7 limit minor seventh / harmonic seventh (7:4). There is also a smaller septimal chromatic semitone of 21:20 between a septimal minor seventh and a fifth (21:8) and an octave and a major third (5:2). Both are more rarely used than their 5 limit neighbours, although the former was often implemented by theorist Cowell, while Partch used the latter as part of his 43 tone scale.

Under 11 limit tuning, there is a fairly common undecimal neutral second (12:11), but it lies on the boundary between the minor and major second (150.6 cents). In just intonation there are infinitely many possibilities for intervals that fall within the range of the semitone (e.g. the Pythagorean semitones mentioned above), but most of them are impractical.

In 13 limit tuning, there is a tridecimal 2/3 tone (13:12 or 138.57 cents) and tridecimal 1/3 tone (27:26 or 65.34 cents).

In 17 limit just intonation, the major diatonic semitone is 15:14 or 119.4 cents, and the minor diatonic semitone is 17:16 or 105.0 cents, and septendecimal limma is 18:17 or 98.95 cents.

Though the names diatonic and chromatic are often used for these intervals, their musical function is not the same as the meantone semitones. For instance, 15:14 would usually be written as an augmented unison, functioning as the chromatic counterpart to a diatonic 16:15. These distinctions are highly dependent on the musical context, and just intonation is not particularly well suited to chromatic use (diatonic semitone function is more prevalent).

=== Other equal temperaments ===
19-tone equal temperament distinguishes between the chromatic and diatonic semitones; in this tuning, the chromatic semitone is one step of the scale, and the diatonic semitone is two. 31-tone equal temperament also distinguishes between these two intervals, which become 2 and 3 steps of the scale, respectively. 53-ET has an even closer match to the two semitones with 3 and 5 steps of its scale while 72-ET uses 4 and 7 steps of its scale.

In general, because the smaller semitone can be viewed as the difference between a minor third and a major third, and the larger as the difference between a major third and a perfect fourth, tuning systems that closely match those just intervals (6/5, 5/4, and 4/3) will also distinguish between the two types of semitones and closely match their just intervals (25/24 and 16/15).

== See also ==
- 12-tone equal temperament
- List of meantone intervals
- List of musical intervals
- List of pitch intervals
- Approach chord
- Major second
- Neutral second
- Pythagorean interval
- Regular temperament
