= Diesis =

Interval in classical music

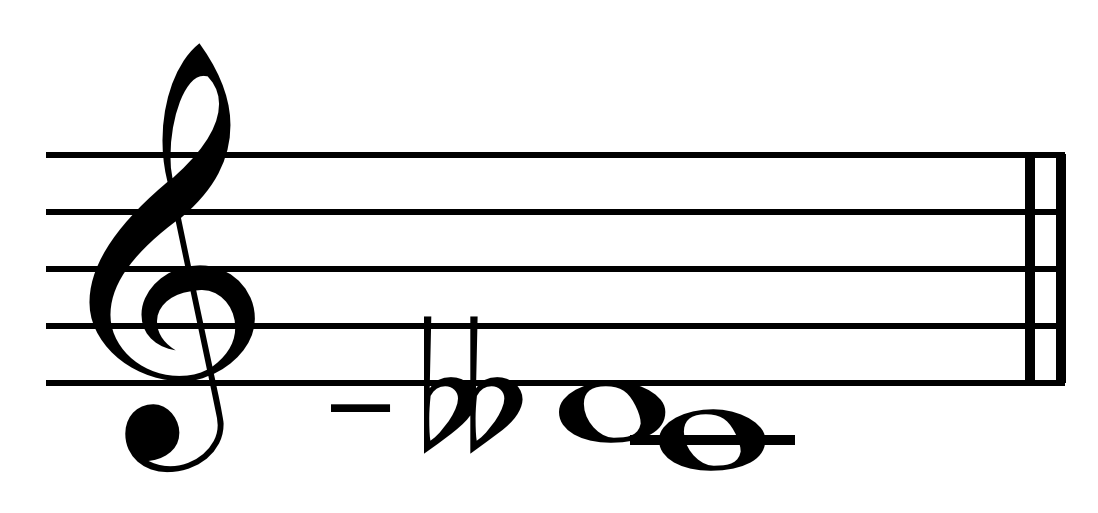
Diesis on C.

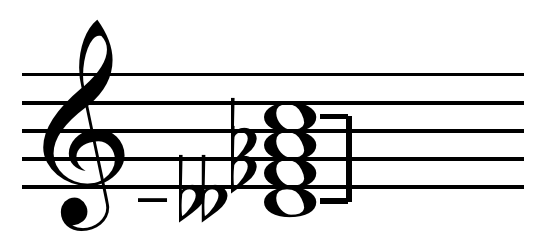
Diesis as three just major thirds.

Diesis (128:125) demonstration
The octave C-C′, the three justly tuned major thirds C-E-G^{♯}-B^{♯} and the descending diesis C′-B^{♯} are played (see example).

In classical music from Western culture, a diesis (/ˈdaɪəsɪs/ DY-ə-siss; pl.: dieses /ˈdaɪəsiz/ DY-ə-seez); from Ancient Greek δίεσις (díesis) 'escape' (Note: The Greek name is based on the technique of playing the aulos, where pitch is raised a small amount by slightly raising the finger on the lowest closed hole, letting a small amount of air "escape".)) is either an accidental (see sharp), or a very small musical interval, usually defined as the difference between an octave (in the ratio 2:1) and three justly tuned major thirds (each tuned in the ratio 5:4), equal to 128:125 or about 41.06 cents. This usual ratio may also be called the enharmonic diesis or lesser diesis. As a comma, it is also known as the enharmonic comma and augmented comma. In 12-tone equal temperament, three major thirds span an octave, so the lesser diesis measures the difference between three equally tempered and justly tuned major thirds.

For instance, an octave (2:1) spans from C to C′, and three justly tuned major thirds (5:4) span from C to B^{♯} (namely, from C, to E, to G^{♯}, to B^{♯}). In this case, the diesis (128:125) is the difference between C-C′ (2:1) and C-B^{♯} (125:64). Notice that this coincides with the interval between B^{♯} and C′, also called a diminished second.

Many acoustics texts use the term greater diesis or diminished comma for the difference between an octave and four justly tuned minor thirds (tuned in the ratio 6:5), which is equal to three syntonic commas minus a schisma, equal to 648:625 or about 62.57 cents (almost one 63.16 cent step-size in 19 equal temperament).

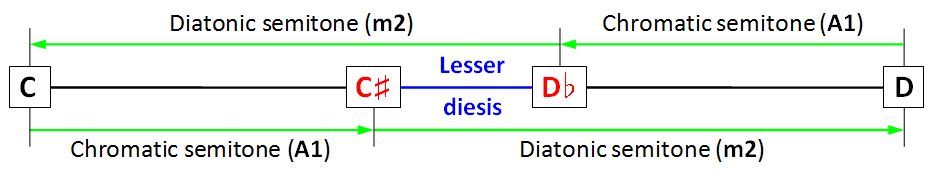
Diesis defined in quarter-comma meantone as a diminished second (m2 − A1 ≈ 117.1 − 76.0 ≈ 41.1 cents), or an interval between two enharmonically equivalent notes (from D^{♭} to C^{♯}).

== Alternative definitions ==
In any tuning system, the deviation of an octave from three major thirds, however large that is, is typically referred to as a diminished second. The diminished second is an interval between pairs of enharmonically equivalent notes; for instance the interval between E and F^{♭}. As mentioned above, the term diesis most commonly refers to the diminished second in quarter-comma meantone temperament. Less frequently and less strictly, the same term is also used to refer to a diminished second of any size. In third-comma meantone, the diminished second is typically denoted as a greater diesis (see below).

In quarter-comma meantone, since major thirds are justly tuned, the width of the diminished second coincides with the above-mentioned value of 128:125. Notice that 128:125 is larger than a unison (1:1). This means that, for instance, C′ is sharper than B^{♯}. In other tuning systems, the diminished second has different widths, and may be smaller than a unison (e.g. C′ may be flatter than B^{♯}):

Name	Ratio	cents	Typical use
greater limma	135 / 128	92.18	ratio of two major whole tones to a minor third
greater diesis	648 / 625	62.57	third-comma meantone (discussed below)
lesser diesis	128 / 125	41.06	(discussed below)
31 EDO diesis	2^{¹/₃₁}	38.71	step-size in 31 equal temperament
Pythagorean comma	( 531 441 )/( 524 288 )	23.46	Pythagorean tuning
diatonic comma	81 / 80	21.51	ratio of 4 fifths to a major third and 2 octaves; measure of fifth tempering in well temperaments
diaschisma	( 2 048 )/( 2 025 )	19.55	sixth-comma meantone
schisma	( 32 805 )/( 32 768 )	1.95	eleventh-comma meantone; limit of acoustic tuning accuracy

In eleventh-comma meantone, the diminished second is within 1/ 716 (0.14%) of a cent above unison, so it closely resembles the 1:1 unison ratio of twelve-tone equal temperament.

The word diesis has also been used to describe several distinct intervals, of varying sizes, but typically around 50 cents. Philolaus used it to describe the interval now usually called a limma, that of a justly tuned perfect fourth (4:3) minus two whole tones (9:8), equal to 256:243 or about 90.22 cents. Rameau (1722) names 148:125 ( [sic], recte 128:125) (Note: Ratio 148:125 corrected to 128:125 in Rameau, J.-P. (1971) [1722]. Treatise on Harmony. Gossett, Philip (translator, introduction, notes) (English (reprint) ed.). New York, NY: Dover Publications. p. 30. ISBN 0-486-22461-9. translation of Rameau (1722)) as a "minor diesis" and 250:243 as a "major diesis", explaining that the latter may be derived through multiplication of the former by the ratio (15 625)/( 15 552 ). (Note: Rameau, J.-P. (1722). Traité de l'harmonie réduite à ses principes naturels [Treatise on Harmony distilled to its natural principles] (in French). Paris, FR: Jean-Baptiste-Christophe Ballard. pp. 26–27. English edition Rameau & Gossett (1971).) Other theorists have used it as a name for various other small intervals.

== Small diesis ==
The small diesis is (3 125)/( 3 072 ) or approximately 29.61 cents.

== Septimal and undecimal diesis ==
The septimal diesis (or slendro diesis) is an interval with the ratio of 49:48, which is the difference between the septimal whole tone and the septimal minor third. It is about 35.70 cents wide.

The undecimal diesis is equal to 45:44 or about 38.91 cents, closely approximated by 31 equal temperament's 38.71 cent half-sharp interval.

== See also ==
- chromatic diesis
- septimal diesis
- ditone
