= Major second =

Musical interval

- Inverse: Minor seventh

Name
- Other names: whole tone, whole step
- Abbreviation: M2

Tuning
- 12 equal temperament: 2 semitones (200 cents)
- Pythagorean tuning: 9:8 (~203.91 cents)
- 5-limit tuning: 10:9 (~182.40 cents)

A harmonic and melodic major second, or diatonic whole tone.

In Western music theory, a major second (sometimes also called whole tone or a whole step) is a second spanning two semitones. A second is a musical interval encompassing two adjacent staff positions (see Interval number for more details). For example, the interval from C to D is a major second, as the note D lies two semitones above C, and the two notes are notated on adjacent staff positions.

== Definition ==
The major second is the interval that occurs between the first and second degrees of a major scale, the tonic and the supertonic. On a musical keyboard, a major second is the interval between two keys separated by one key, counting white and black keys alike. On a guitar string, it is the interval separated by two frets. In moveable-do solfège, it is the interval between do and re. It is considered a melodic step, as opposed to larger intervals called skips.

Intervals composed of two semitones, such as the major second and the diminished third, are also called tones, whole tones, or whole steps.

In a major scale, there are major seconds between the first, second, and third notes, as well as between the fourth, fifth, and sixth notes.

The major second was historically considered one of the most dissonant intervals of the diatonic scale, although much 20th-century music saw it reimagined as a consonance. It is common in many different musical systems, including Arabic music, Turkish music and music of the Balkans, among others. It occurs in both diatonic and pentatonic scales.

== Major and minor tones ==
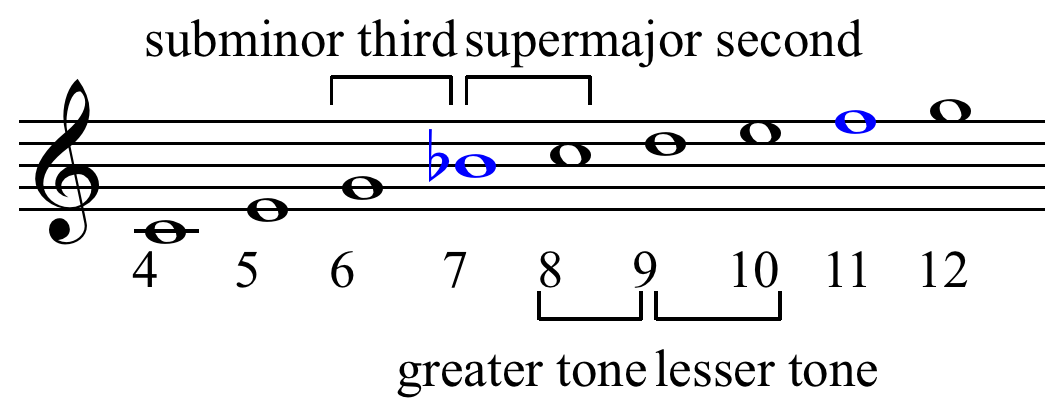
Partials 4–12 of the harmonic series include the greater and lesser tones.

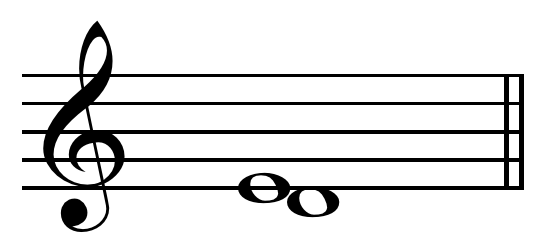
Lesser tone on D.

The harmonic series yields two different sizes of whole tones. The first is known as the "greater tone". Its 9:8 frequency ratio is about 4 cents larger than the whole tone of equal temperament. The "lesser tone" is in a 10:9 ratio and is 18 cents smaller. Their size differs by exactly one syntonic comma (81:80, or about 21.5 cents). Some equal temperaments, such as 15-ET and 22-ET, also distinguish between a greater and a lesser tone.

The major tone is the 9:8 interval, and it is an approximation thereof in other tuning systems, while the minor tone is the 10:9 ratio. The major tone may be derived from the harmonic series as the interval between the eighth and ninth harmonics. The minor tone may be derived from the harmonic series as the interval between the ninth and tenth harmonics. The 10:9 minor tone arises in the C major scale between D and E and between G and A, and is "a sharper dissonance" than 9:8. The 9:8 major tone arises in the C major scale between C and D, F and G, and A and B. The Pythagoreans called the 9:8 interval an epogdoon.

In these tuning systems, a third kind of whole tone, even wider than the major tone, exists. This interval of two semitones, with ratio 256:225, is simply called the diminished third (for further details, see Five-limit tuning § Size of intervals).

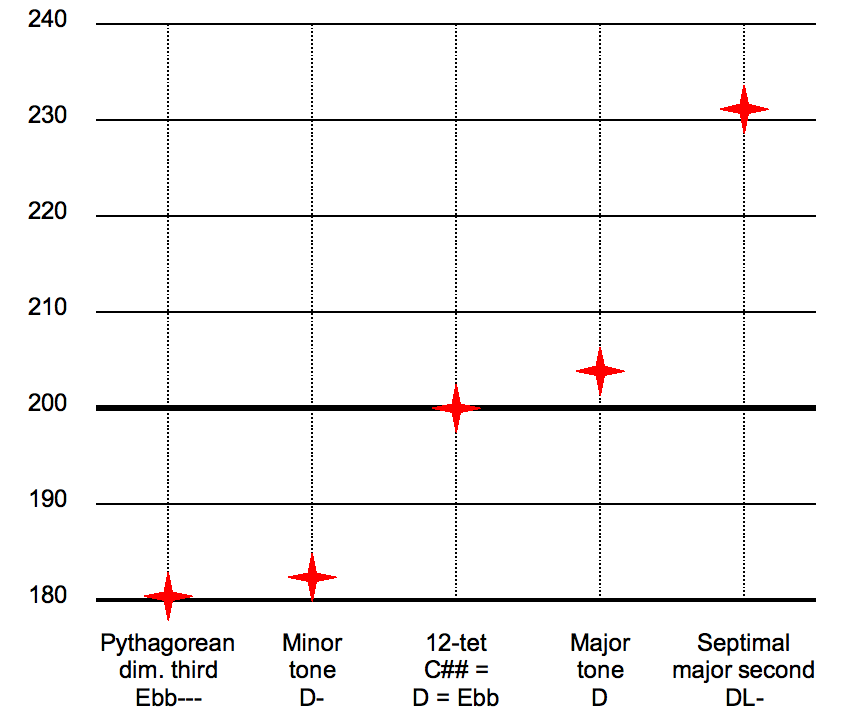
Comparison, in cents, of intervals at or near a major second

Some equal temperaments also produce major seconds of two different sizes, called greater and lesser tones (or major and minor tones). For instance, this is true for 15-ET, 22-ET, 34-ET, 41-ET, 53-ET, and 72-ET. Conversely, in twelve-tone equal temperament, Pythagorean tuning, and meantone temperament (including 19-ET and 31-ET) all major seconds have the same size, so there cannot be a distinction between a greater and a lesser tone.

In any system where there is only one size of major second, the terms greater and lesser tone (or major and minor tone) are rarely used with a different meaning. Namely, they are used to indicate the two distinct kinds of whole tone, more commonly and more appropriately called major second (M2) and diminished third (d3). Similarly, major semitones and minor semitones are more often and more appropriately referred to as minor seconds (m2) and augmented unisons (A1), or diatonic and chromatic semitones.

Unlike most uses of the terms major and minor, these intervals span the same number of semitones. They both span 2 semitones, while, for example, a major third (4 semitones) and minor third (3 semitones) differ by one semitone. Thus, to avoid ambiguity, it is preferable to call them greater tone and lesser tone (see also greater and lesser diesis).

Two major tones equal a ditone.

== Epogdoon ==
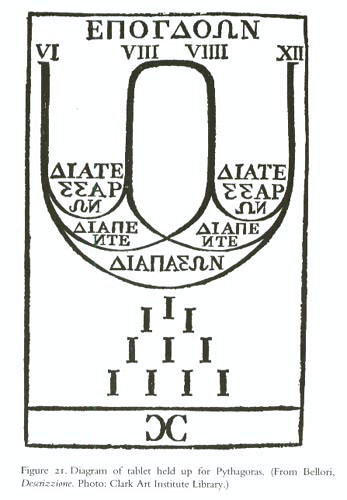
Diagram Pythagoras studies in The School of Athens showing relations between epogdoon, diatessaron, diapente, and diapason.

Epogdoon (Ancient Greek: ἐπόγδοον) translates to "on top of an eighth". Mathematically, epogdoon refers to the addition of a number and one eighth of itself. Because an eighth of 8 is 1, the epogdoon of 8 is 9. According to Plutarch's Moralia, the Pythagoreans hated the number 17 as it separates 16 from its epogdoon 18.

In Raphael's fresco The School of Athens, Pythagoras is shown consulting a diagram titled "Epogdoon". In Pythagorean tuning, the epogdoon is the interval with the ratio 9:8.

Epogdoos is commonly translated as "tone". In Philolaus' fifth century BC writing, he defined the scale as five epogdoics and two diesis. He sometimes used epogdoos generally enough that its mathematical meaning was irrelevant.

== See also ==
- Diminished third
- List of meantone intervals
- Minor second
- Pythagorean interval
- Whole tone scale
