= Interval ratio =

In music, ratio of pitch frequencies

3-limit 9:8 major tone.

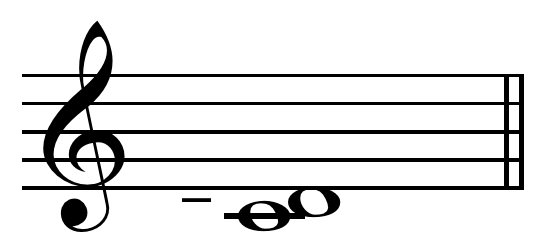
5-limit 10:9 minor tone.

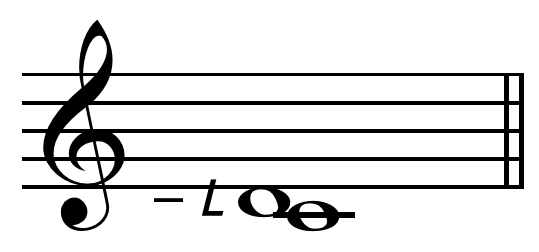
7-limit 8:7 septimal whole tone.

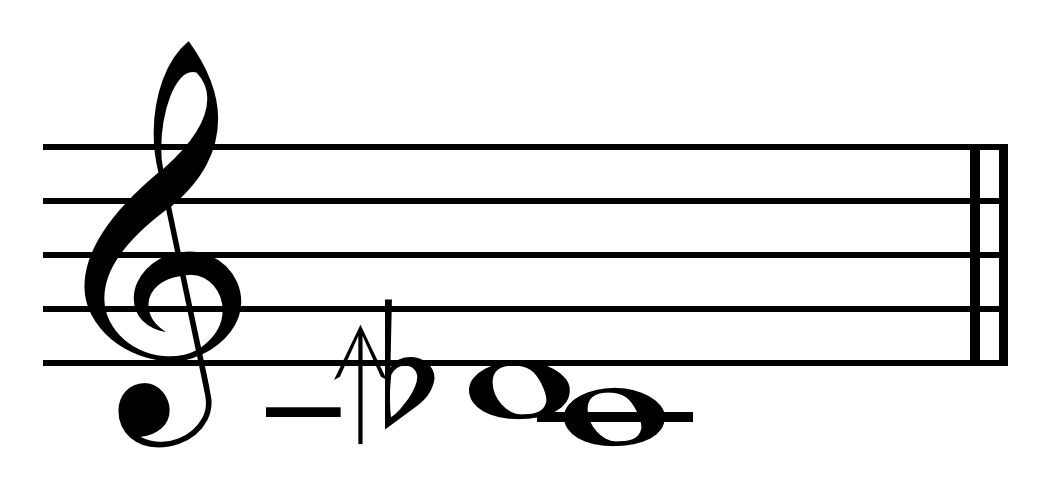
11-limit 11:10 greater undecimal neutral second.

In music, an interval ratio is a ratio of the frequencies of the pitches in a musical interval. For example, a just perfect fifth (for example C to G) is 3:2, 1.5, and may be approximated by an equal tempered perfect fifth which is 2^{7/12} (about 1.498). If the A above middle C is 440 Hz, the perfect fifth above it would be E, at (440*1.5=) 660 Hz, while the equal tempered E5 is 659.255 Hz.

Ratios, rather than direct frequency measurements, allow musicians to work with relative pitch measurements applicable to many instruments in an intuitive manner, whereas one rarely has the frequencies of fixed pitched instruments memorized and rarely has the capabilities to measure the changes of adjustable pitch instruments (electronic tuner). Ratios have an inverse relationship to string length, for example stopping a string at two-thirds (2:3) its length produces a pitch one and one-half (3:2) that of the open string (not to be confused with inversion).

Intervals may be ranked by relative consonance and dissonance. As such ratios with lower integers are generally more consonant than intervals with higher integers. For example, 2:1, 4:3, 9:8, 65536:59049, etc.

Consonance and dissonance may more subtly be defined by limit, wherein the ratios whose limit, which includes its integer multiples, is lower are generally more consonant. For example, the 3-limit 128:81 and the 7-limit 14:9. Despite having larger integers 128:81 is less dissonant than 14:9, as according to limit theory.

For ease of comparison intervals may also be measured in cents, a logarithmic measurement. For example, the just perfect fifth is 701.955 cents while the equal tempered perfect fifth is 700 cents.

== Usage ==
Frequency ratios are used to describe intervals in both Western and non-Western music. They are most often used to describe intervals between notes tuned with tuning systems such as Pythagorean tuning, just intonation, and meantone temperament, the size of which can be expressed by small-integer ratios.

When a musical instrument is tuned using a just intonation tuning system, the size of the main intervals can be expressed by small-integer ratios, such as 1:1 (unison), 2:1 (octave), 3:2 (perfect fifth), 4:3 (perfect fourth), 5:4 (major third), 6:5 (minor third). Intervals with small-integer ratios are often called just intervals, or pure intervals. To most people, just intervals sound consonant, i.e. pleasant and well-tuned.

Most commonly, however, musical instruments are nowadays tuned using a different tuning system, called 12-tone equal temperament, in which the main intervals are typically perceived as consonant, but none is justly tuned and as consonant as a just interval, except for the unison and octave. Although the size of equally tuned intervals is typically similar to that of just intervals, in most cases it cannot be expressed by small-integer ratios. For instance, an equal tempered perfect fifth has a frequency ratio of about 1.4983:1 (or 14983:10000). For a comparison between the size of intervals in different tuning systems, see section Size in different tuning systems.
