= Parasite (disambiguation) =

A parasite is an organism that has sustained contact with another organism to the detriment of the host organism.

Parasite, parasitism, or parasitic may also refer to:

== Film and television ==
- The Parasite (1925 film), an American silent film
- Parasite (1982 film), an American science fiction horror film
- Parasite (2019 film), a South Korean black comedy thriller film
- "Parasite" (Heroes), an episode of Heroes
- "Parasite", an episode of Teen Titans Go!
- "The Parasite" (The Amazing World of Gumball), an episode of The Amazing World of Gumball

== Literature ==
- The Parasite, an 1894 novelette by Sir Arthur Conan Doyle
- The Parasites, a 1949 novel by Daphne Du Maurier
- Parasite (character), several supervillains in DC Comics
- Parasite (Grant novel), a 2013 novel by Mira Grant
- Parasite (Mortimore novel), a 1994 Doctor Who novel by Jim Mortimore

== Music ==
- Parasite (band), a band from Surrey, England
- Parasites (band), an American pop-punk band

=== Albums ===
- Parasite (Fractal Glider album) (2002)
- Parasite!, a 2006 EP by Mustasch
- Parasite (See You Next Tuesday album) (2007)
- Parasite (The Spoiled album) (2025)
- Parasite, a 2017 EP by The Coathangers

=== Songs ===
- "Parasite" (song), a 1974 song by Kiss from Hotter Than Hell
- "Parasite", a song by Betraying the Martyrs from Rapture
- "Parasite", a song by Bullet for My Valentine from Bullet for My Valentine
- "Parasite", a song by Circle of Dust from Circle of Dust
- "Parasite", a song by Disturbed from Indestructible
- "Parasite", a song by Godflesh from Post Self
- "Parasite", a song by How to Destroy Angels from the How to Destroy Angels EP
- "Parasite", a song by Nick Drake from Pink Moon
- "Parasite", a song by Rachel Chinouriri from I Think I Spoke Too Soon
- "Parasite", a song by Taemin from Phase 1: Soft Violence
- "Parasite", a song by Volbeat from Rewind, Replay, Rebound
- "Parasite", a song by Wolves at the Gate from Wasteland
- "Parasites", a song by Daniel Kahn & the Painted Bird from Partisans and Parasites
- "Parasites", a song by Madder Mortem from Red in Tooth and Claw
- "Parasites", a song by Polaris from Fatalism
- "Parasites", a song by Ugly Casanova from Sharpen Your Teeth
- "The Parasite", a song by Swans from The Beggar

== Other uses ==
- Parasite (journal), a scientific journal on parasitology
- Parasitism (social offense), a charge that a group or class in society is detrimental to the whole
- An outdated term for epenthesis.

== See also ==
- Para Site, an independent non-profit arts organisation in Hong Kong
- Parasyte, a 1989 manga series by Hitoshi Iwaaki
- Parasitic plants, plants that grow on other plants
- Ectoparasitic infestation, bugs and such attacking a host.
- Parasitus, a stock character in ancient Roman comedy
- Paraziții, a Romanian hip hop band
- Parisite, a rare mineral
- Social parasitism (disambiguation)
