= Mel Bay =

American musician and publisher (1913–1997)

- Mel Bay playing mandolin, about 1963, used in his book Fun With the Mandolin.

Background information
- Born: Melbourne Earl Bay; February 25, 1913; Bunker, Missouri, U.S.
- Died: May 14, 1997 (aged 84) St. Louis, Missouri
- Genres: Classical, folk, country, jazz
- Occupations: Publisher, educator, musician
- Instruments: guitar, tenor banjo, ukulele, mandolin, Hawaiian guitar
- Label: Mel Bay

Melbourne Earl Bay (February 25, 1913 – May 14, 1997), known professionally as Mel Bay, was an American musician and publisher best known for his series of music education books. His Encyclopedia of Guitar Chords, first published in 1971, remains a bestseller.

== Biography ==
=== Early life ===
Melbourne Earl Bay was born on February 25, 1913, in the little Ozark Mountain town of Bunker, Missouri. He bought a Sears Roebuck guitar at the age of 13 and several months later played his first "gig". Bay did not have a guitar teacher, so Bay watched the few guitarists he knew and copied their fingering on the fretboard, teaching himself chords. Once he felt he knew the rudiments of the guitar, he started experimenting with other instruments, including the tenor banjo, mandolin, Hawaiian guitar, and ukulele.

Bay played in front of an audience every chance he got, including a stint with a snake oil salesman in and around his hometown. The man hired Bay to play the banjo while sitting in the salesman's car. Once a crowd gathered to listen, Bay would stop playing, and the salesman would pitch his cure-all.

=== St. Louis and Kirkwood ===
Bay knew that to make it as a professional musician he would have to be in a large city. He therefore moved to St. Louis in 1933, and later to suburban Kirkwood, Missouri, to find his audience. He played with numerous local and traveling bands. In addition, he landed staff guitar jobs on several radio stations. He led the Mel Bay Trio and played for twenty-five years.

While Bay was pursuing his playing career, he continued to teach as many as 100 students a week. He decided to begin writing instructional material due to the difficulty encountered by guitarists in playing chord forms in rhythm sections, and the poor note reading ability prevalent among guitarists at that time. These books became the basis of the Mel Bay instructional method and the Mel Bay publication house.

== Mel Bay Publications ==
After the war, Bay was asked to write instructional material on the guitar for GIs wishing to learn music under the GI Bill. When he approached the three major music publishers in New York City, they turned him down, saying there was no future in the guitar. In 1947, he formed Mel Bay Publications and wrote the first book, The Orchestral Chord System for Guitar. This book is still in print under the title Rhythm Guitar Chord System. His Modern Guitar Method was written shortly after in 1948. After the success of Elvis Presley in the early 1950s, the guitar became more popular, helping to ensure the success of the company. For years Bay traveled from town to town, talking to guitar teachers and players, and showing them his publications. He claimed to have known every guitar teacher in America on a first-name basis.

Mel Bay Publications produces instruction books and sheet music for many instruments (guitar, banjo, mandolin, harmonica, violin, clarinet, accordion) and many genres (classical, jazz, folk, blues, rock).

== Later career ==
Bay sold D'Angelico guitars. He played professionally on his New Yorker model, but his favorite was the Mel Bay Model made by John D'Angelico as a gift. The guitar had the features of New Yorker, but it was a "cutaway" model with a thinner neck. This guitar has been pictured on the Mel Bay Modern Guitar Method for decades.

Mel Bay was still playing guitar every day until his death in 1997 at age 84.

== Awards and honors ==
Mel Bay received Lifetime Achievement awards from the Guitar Foundation of America, the Retail Print Music Dealers Association, and the American Federation of Musicians. The St. Louis Music Educators Association gave him a Certificate of Merit. The Missouri House of Representatives honored his achievements with a resolution. Mayor Freeman Bosley Jr. made October 25, 1996 Mel Bay Day in St. Louis. President Bill Clinton sent Bay a letter of commendation. He was inducted into the American Banjo Museum Hall of Fame in 2001 for his work furthering banjo instruction.

== Influence ==
Many guitarists have studied Bay's books. Guitar Player magazine called him "the George Washington of the guitar". Sales of his Modern Guitar Method series are estimated to be more than 20 million copies. Bay established the structure for modern guitar education and helped increase the popularity of guitar.

The comedy song "Ode to Mel Bay" (written and first recorded by Michael "Supe" Granda of the Ozark Mountain Daredevils and featured on the album The Day Finger Pickers Took Over the World by Tommy Emmanuel and Chet Atkins), pokes fun at Mel Bay's books.

== See also ==
- Banjo Hall of Fame Members
