= Fractal Glider =

Australian psychedelic trance artist

Fractal Glider is the stage name of Paul McCosh, a psychedelic trance artist from Melbourne, Australia.

== Fractal Glider ==
McCosh began his career under the stage name Fractal Glider. McCosh was noted for his original high energy sound, and for being representative of the Melbourne psychedelic/trance scene. He appeared mainly in Australia, Japan and New Zealand, but also participated in parties and festivals in Portugal, Sweden, Switzerland, the Netherlands, France and Belgium, including the Earthcore electronic music festival.

McCosh began composing trance music in 1995, prior to which he worked as a sound engineer. He released two albums. His debut album, Parasite was released on Boom Records (Netherlands). His second and last album, Digital Mandala featured several new tracks and a remix of "Mezmorized". To promote this album McCosh went on an international tour through Japan, France, Netherlands, Belgium, Switzerland, Portugal, Hungary and Austria in 2003. Fractal Glider has also released singles on 14 compilations on different labels worldwide.

Fractal Glider appeared on the television program Sounds Like Techno, produced by the Australian Broadcasting Corporation in 2003.

== Liquid ==
Along with Ozzy, another Australian artist, Paul McCosh formed the group Liquid. The music features a fusion of electronic beats with rock riffs. The act established itself on the international scene with many sellout appearances throughout Japan and Australia. Liquid's last known release of music was in 2007.

== Later career ==
McCosh has gone on to release a new 3 track EP in 2014 titles 'Eclectic Ecliptic' released on Boom Records.

== Discography ==
- Parasite (Boom Records 2002)
- Digital Mandala (Boom Records 2003)
- Zactoglider (DAT Records 2023)
