= Intervals (See You Next Tuesday album) =

Studio album by See You Next Tuesday
- Released: October 21, 2008
- Genres: Deathcore, mathcore
- Length: 29:48
- Label: Ferret

See You Next Tuesday chronology
Parasite (2007)	Intervals (2008)	Distractions (2023)

Professional ratings
Review scores
Source	Rating
MetalSucks	4/5 stars

Intervals is the second studio album by See You Next Tuesday. It was set to be released on October 14, but was pushed back to October 21, 2008 by Ferret.

The album shows the band progressing towards an overall death metal sound, rather than continuing to showcase the more predominant metalcore influence of their previous releases.

Many of the tracks are under a minute, with the exception of a ten-minute concluding song.

== Track listing ==
No.	Title	Length
1.	"Nascence"	0:58
2.	"In the End"	2:20
3.	"The Life in Death"	0:42
4.	"Eternity?"	1:15
5.	"Alpha"	0:05
6.	"She Once Said I Was a Romantic"	1:09
7.	"Daydreams"	0:45
8.	"Nightmares"	0:39
9.	"In the Beginning" (featuring Nate Johnson of Fit for an Autopsy)	1:09
10.	"Forever on Deaf Ears"	2:34
11.	"Goodnight (Our Last Dance)"	1:17
12.	"This Time The Keys Are Broken"	0:57
13.	"Dedication to a New Era" (featuring Nate Johnson of Fit for an Autopsy)	3:07
14.	"One of These Days"	0:57
15.	"Omega"	0:17
16.	"11/27/07"	1:12
17.	"January and On"	10:35
