= Mel Bay's Deluxe Encyclopedia of Guitar Chords =

- Author: Mel Bay, William Bay
- Language: English
- Genre: Music education
- Publisher: Mel Bay Publications
- Publication date: 1971
- Publication place: United States
- Media type: Print
- Pages: 144

Mel Bay's Deluxe Encyclopedia of Guitar Chords, also known as the Encyclopedia of Guitar Chords or Deluxe Guitar Chord Encyclopedia, is a best-selling encyclopedia of guitar chords, first published by Mel Bay in 1971. It is a staple in the study and teaching of guitar.

The encyclopedia contains 324 different chord types; 27 in each of the 12 keys with thousands of shapes and inversions. The 27 chord types covered in each key are major, minor, diminished, augmented, seventh, minor seventh, seventh augmented fifth, seventh flat fifth, major seventh, major seventh flat third, major seventh flat fifth, seventh suspended fourth, sixth, minor sixth, ninth, minor ninth, major ninth, ninth sharp fifth, ninth flat fifth, seventh flat ninth, seventh sharp ninth, sixth add ninth, eleventh, augmented eleventh, thirteenth, thirteenth flat ninth, and thirteenth flat ninth flat fifth. The chords are "presented in each key and are broken down into melody, inside, rhythm, and bottom four-strings."

The book has since been published in a case-size edition by William Bay, Mel's son and has spawned a series of similar books like the Encyclopedia of Guitar Chord Progressions (first published in 1977), Encyclopedia of Guitar Chord Inversions, Mel Bay's Deluxe Guitar Scale Book, Encyclopedia of Jazz Guitar Runs, Fills, Licks & Lines, and Piano, Mandolin and Banjo chord encyclopedias.

The song "Ode to Mel Bay" (written and first recorded by Michael "Supe" Granda of the Ozark Mountain Daredevils and featured on the album The Day Finger Pickers Took Over the World by Tommy Emmanuel and Chet Atkins), is a light-hearted song about Mel Bay's encyclopedia of guitar chords and the books in general. Mentioned in the lyrics, written by Shel Silverstein, is: "On page 21 you showed us how to play a G and on page 22 you showed us how to play a D, but lordy o lordy we never learned to play an E, because someone in the outhouse stole page 23!"
