= Parasite (band) =

- Origin: Surrey, England
- Genres: Pop; Rock
- Years active: 1998–2012
- Members: Adam Scanlon; Deok-jin Joo; Iain Ballantine; Will Saunders; Dan Banks
- Website: www.parasiteofficial.co.uk

Parasite was a band from Surrey, England, that formed at school in 1998 and became active in the early 2000s.

== History ==
=== 1998–2003: Early years ===
In December 1998, Parasite was formed by Adam Scanlon and Deok-jin Joo, who had previously been in a band called Rapid Fire at school. They were joined shortly after by drummer Murray Boyton and keyboard player Patrick Martin. This lineup was short-lived, however, as in 1999 Joo moved back to his home country of South Korea. In 2000/01 Murray Boyton and other members left the band, leaving Adam Scanlon on his own. Not discouraged, he successfully recorded the first Parasite demo, the dark and bizarre Seismic Activity EP, which consisted of songs and ideas accumulated over the previous few years, and soon he had a new bandmate in the form of bassist Iain Ballantine. The duo added a drum machine to their sound to make up for the lack of a drummer and released a handful of new self-produced singles and EPs (the Seismic Activity EP, and the Infrared and Infrared Remix singles). In 2003, the band's first full-length album, The Infection, was finished after five years of planning and recording, and the third version of Infrared was released as a single.

=== 2004–2006: Scanlon & Saunders ===
The band's second EP, the That's Our Name... EP, was released in early 2004, and featured songs recorded throughout the previous year. In March of that year, the band became a duo again after the departure of Ballantine, who had decided he wasn't committed enough to the music. Typically, the lineup continued to be unstable throughout the entire year, as a month later they were joined by drummer Marcus Belassie, and in September by bassist/guitarist/vocalist Will Saunders. At Saunders' suggestion, the band began to practise at the Scout Hut in Shalford, notable for being the place where The Stranglers used to practise before they became well known. It was not long before Belassie decided he wasn't interested anymore and left. 2004 closed with two new independent releases, the That's Our Game... EP (including another version of Infrared) and the You Wouldn't Believe Me... If It Wasn't True single. In January 2005 the band slimmed down to a duo of Scanlon and Saunders and a month later the band's second full-length album, The Ancient Modern, was finished. The second single from this album was Shoulder to Cry On. The band began to perform live more frequently, trying out new material that the Scanlon/Saunders partnership was now producing. The band's third album, The Spring Collection, was released late in the year. Saunders departed for Cambodia until early 2006, and Scanlon began studying for a four-year Chemistry degree at the University of East Anglia. In November, another single was released, Bright and Bubbly.

Between summer 2006 and summer 2007 the band collaborated with producer Ben Turk on what they described as 'the best-sounding music we've ever done', namely new material and new versions of old tracks. The first fruits of this collaboration appeared on the limited edition EP Selection Pack, only available at gigs around the Christmas 2006 period.

=== 2007–2008: Out with the New and Saunders departure ===
Saunders and Scanlon in 2007

In the Summer of 2007, the band made their first foray into the world of commercially available downloadable music with the download-only single Master Yoga, available on iTunes around June. The band used the experience gained from this release to prepare for the follow-up You Wouldn't Believe Me... If It Wasn't True, released on 29 October 2007 and described as "sardonic, doom laden and mesmerising" by subba-cultcha.com. Both tracks were from the debut "proper" album under the title of Out with the New available on CD and download from 19 May 2008. Amidst these releases, on 9 January 2008, Will Saunders amicably left the band after a successful stint lasting for more than three years. He was immediately replaced by Dan Stobbart. A third single from Out with the New, Infrared was released on the band's own Parasite Stuff Recordings Ltd label on 4 February 2008.

=== 2008–2010: Second Sight and Tensies ===
On 24 March 2008 Kevin Lennon joined on bass, whilst Stobbart left on the 27th. Not wanting the new material to go to waste, Scanlon bought some recording equipment and recorded a second album, Second Sight, between September and December 2008. The whole record was performed, produced and mixed by Scanlon himself, apart from one backward guitar chord performed by Bob Williams who was the Parasite guitarist between November 2008 and July 2009. The album was released on 7 July 2009, the same day that the band played a headline gig at the Purple Turtle in Camden. This would be Williams last performance with the band, and the first time that he met Lennon, who was drumming in the support act The Brain Children (Lennon's time in Parasite petered out due to the unworkable distance between him and Scanlon). The three singles from the album were Deja Vu, for which a video was made, and which received a positive review in Artrocker magazine, My Reunion and the live favourite Machine. During this time Scanlon also joined the band No Superhero as their bassist.

Spurred on by the success of the gigs, Scanlon performed some solo gigs (despite his technical inadequacies on the guitar) in late 2009, and a brand new single called Tensies was released on 1 January 2010, again performed, produced and mixed by Scanlon.

=== 2010–2012: Scanlon & Banks, and breakup ===
By the Spring of 2010, Scanlon had asked his No Superhero bandmate Dan Banks to join on guitar and the duo was able to put together a much more polished live show. Due to Banks' enthusiasm for music production, the band began work on brand new material, including studio recordings of the latest additions to the live sets. A non-album single The People Aren't Going to Stand for This was released in response to the 2011 England Riots in August 2011. Written and recorded in two days, the band was unhappy with the mix. Although a third album was recorded and artwork completed the band dissolved late into the mixing process due to growing musical differences and a big clash of personalities. However to this day Scanlon continues working on songs.

== Personnel ==
- Adam Scanlon (lead singer) (1998–2020) – vocals, bass, keyboards, hardware
- Deok-jin Joo (1998–1999) – keyboards, vocals, software
- Iain Ballantine (2001–2004) – guitar, bass
- Will Saunders (Everything Else) (2004–2020) – guitar, bass, vocals, synth
- Dan Banks (2010–2012) – guitar, vocals, software

== Discography ==
=== Albums ===
- Out with the New (2008)
- Second Sight (2009)
- Strawberry Fuel (unreleased 2012, mixing unfinished)

=== Singles and EPs ===
- Master Yoga (2007)
- You Wouldn't Believe Me... If It Wasn't True (2007)
- Infrared (2008)
- Deja Vu (2009)
- My Reunion (2009)
- Machine (2009)
- Tensies (2010)
- The People Aren't Going to Stand for This (2011)

=== Demo albums ===
- The Infection (2003)
- The Ancient Modern (2005)
- The Spring Collection (2005)

=== Demo singles and EPs ===
- The Seismic Activity EP (2001)
- Infrared (2002)
- Infrared Remix (2002)
- Infrared (re-recording) (2003)
- That's Our Name... EP (2004)
- ...That's Our Game EP (2004)
- You Wouldn't Believe Me... If It Wasn't True (2004)
- Shoulder to Cry On (2005)
- Bright and Bubbly (2005)
- Selection Pack EP (limited edition) (2006)
