= Social parasitism =

Social parasitism or social parasite may refer to the following:

- Parasitism (social offense), a label for those deemed to contribute insufficiently to human society
- Social parasitism (biology), interspecies relationship based on exploiting interactions between members of a social species
- "Social Parasite", a song by Alice in Chains from the album Music Bank

== See also ==
- Parasite (disambiguation)
