= See You Next Tuesday (band) =

American deathcore band

- Origin: Bay City, Michigan, United States
- Genres: Deathcore; mathcore; grindcore
- Years active: 2004–2009; 2015–present
- Labels: Ferret; Good Fight
- Members: Drew Slavik; James Watson; Chris Fox; Rick Woods
- Past members: Adam Payne; Adam Karpinski; Brandon Schroder; Travis Martin; Jake Duhaime; Josh Kreuger; Andy Dalton
- Website: www.iheartcunt.com (archived via Archive.org)

See You Next Tuesday is an American deathcore band from Bay City, Michigan. Founded in 2004, the group was active until their initial disbandment in 2009. During this period, they were signed to indie label Ferret Music and released two full-length studio albums, Parasite (2007) and Intervals (2008). The band cited financial difficulties and personal circumstances as the primary reasons for their dissolution.

In spring 2015, See You Next Tuesday announced it would be making a one-off appearance to perform at Don't Call It A Fest II on September 12, 2015. Following this performance, the group, after deliberations, elected to continue their activities and formally reestablished themselves as an active band, subsequently signing with Good Fight Entertainment. In early 2023, they released their third studio album, Distractions, marking their first full-length release in approximately fifteen years.

== History ==
See You Next Tuesday was formed in Bay City, Michigan, in February 2004, the band originally started out as a joke, but when the group found their early live performances went well, they began to take their music seriously. The group released two EPs with their original vocalist, Brandon "Bear" Schroder before his leaving in late 2006. After Schroder's departure, Chris Fox, formerly of the metalcore band Flesh and Blood Robot took his place. With this new See You Next Tuesday line-up, they developed their debut full-length album Parasite at Planet Red Studios in Richmond, Virginia and it was released in April 2007 on Ferret Music. According to the band members, the album had to be recorded twice due to the original finished guitar and drum tracks being lost in a computer crash. It is said that the second recording session (the one that ended up on the record) was a better and smoother recording than the original one that was lost in the crash. The album, containing 14 tracks, was produced by Andreas Magnusson, and was released on April 3, 2007, to mixed reviews.

They have toured extensively in the United States and Canada with a wide variety of bands, including Coalesce, Daughters, August Burns Red, Chasing Victory, From a Second Story Window, The Number Twelve Looks Like You, Job for a Cowboy, Suicide Silence, Winds of Plague, Despised Icon, Psyopus and The Acacia Strain.

In an interview when asked about the departure of their vocalist Brandon "Bear" Schroder, former bassist Travis Martin explained that he left for health reasons, and directly explained the following:

Bear left for a number of reasons, the main reason being his health. On the last tour he did with us he had a lot of chest pain and felt really weak by tour's end. He went to the hospital and found out his lungs were only working at a fraction of what they should have been. His doctor told him that his only option was to stop screaming, which was actually the second time he had been told. This time he thought it best to listen.

In 2008, See You Next Tuesday released their second album, Intervals and it peaked at No. 46 on the Billboard Heatseekers chart. On See You Next Tuesday's MySpace profile, they stated that Intervals "may as well be their first album", as the record relies less on spastic mathcore riffs in favor of more-focused death metal-influenced parts.

Most recently, the band announced that they would be going on indefinite hiatus after their August 16, 2009 show in their hometown. In 2011, the members stated that they expressed interest in continuing See You Next Tuesday, but so far have not made any certain announcement since this time.

On May 22, 2015, the band announced that they would make a one-off appearance to perform at Don't Call It A Fest II on September 12, 2015. Over a week after the performance, they announced they would be reuniting. That same year, the band started their first ever Facebook page and performed a handful of further shows.

On November 15, 2022, the band released their first new song in fourteen years titled "Hey Look, No Crying", and also announced their upcoming third album, Distractions, would be released on February 17, 2023. On February 16, 2024, the band released Relapses, a remix album which is an electric-forward re-edit of Distractions.

== Meaning of the name ==
The phrase "See You Next Tuesday" is a popular slang meaning "cunt", it originates from a humorous backronym which spells out "C U Next Tuesday".

At first, the band's merchandise held the initials "SYNT", to which the band later changed to "CUNT". Merchandise from the band has the initials "SYNT" and "CUNT" on different material. Fans of the band also will frequently abbreviate the band's name as "CUNT", more often than they will "SYNT".

== Band members ==
Current lineup

- Drew Slavik − guitar (2004–2009, 2015–present)
- Rick Woods − bass guitar (2005–2006, 2017–present)
- Chris Fox − vocals (2006–2009, 2015–present)
- James Watson − drums (2022–present)

Former members

- Andy Dalton − drums (2004–2008, 2015–2022)
- Brandon "Bear" Schroder − vocals (2004–2006)
- Adam Karpinski − guitar (2004–2006)
- Adam Payne – bass guitar (2004–2005)
- Travis Martin − bass guitar (2006–2008)
- Josh "Kooter" Krueger − bass guitar (2008–2009, 2015–2016)
- Jake Duhaime – drums (2008–2009)

Timeline

== Discography ==
Albums

- Parasite (2007)
- Intervals (2008)
- Distractions (2023)

EPs

- This Was a Tragedy (2004)
- Summer Sampler (2005)
- Asymmetrics (2024, split / collaboration with Meth)
- Brothers (2026, split / collaboration with Chop Chop Chop Chop Chop Chop Chop)

Compilations

- God Awful Sonic History (2020)

Remix albums

- Relapses (2024)
