= List of fifth intervals =

In the theory and practice of music, a fifth interval is an ordered pair of notes that are separated by an interval of 6–8 semitones.

There are three types of fifth intervals, namely

- perfect fifths (7 semitones),
- diminished fifth (6 semitones), and
- augmented fifth (8 semitones).

After the unison and octave intervals, the perfect fifth is the most important interval in tonal harmony. It is highly consonant. Its implementation in equal temperament tuning is highly accurate, unlike the major third interval, for example. As explained below, it is used to generate the chromatic circle and the cycle of fifths, and it is used for tuning string-instruments. It is a constituent interval for the fundamental chords of tonal harmony.

== Tonal harmony ==
The fundamental chords of tonal music—major and minor triads and also seventh chords—all contain fifth intervals.

- Perfect fifths are contained in major and minor triads and in particular seventh chords (especially major-minor sevenths with dominant function, major sevenths, and minor sevenths).
- Diminished fifths are contained in diminished triads and in half-diminished sevenths and fully diminished seventh chords.

Fifths are stacked to form chords in quintal harmony.

=== Cycle of fifths ===
The circle of fifths drawn within the chromatic circle as a regular star dodecagon

Concatenating the perfect fifths ((F, C), (C, G), (G, D), (D, A), (A, E), (E, B),...) generates the sequence of fifths (F, C, G, D, A, E, B, F♯, ...); this sequence of fifths displays all twelve notes of the chromatic circle.

=== Harmonization of scales in fifths ===
==== Major scale on C ====
All but one of the intervals are perfect fifths. The (b, f) interval is a diminished fifth.

=== Tuning of instruments ===
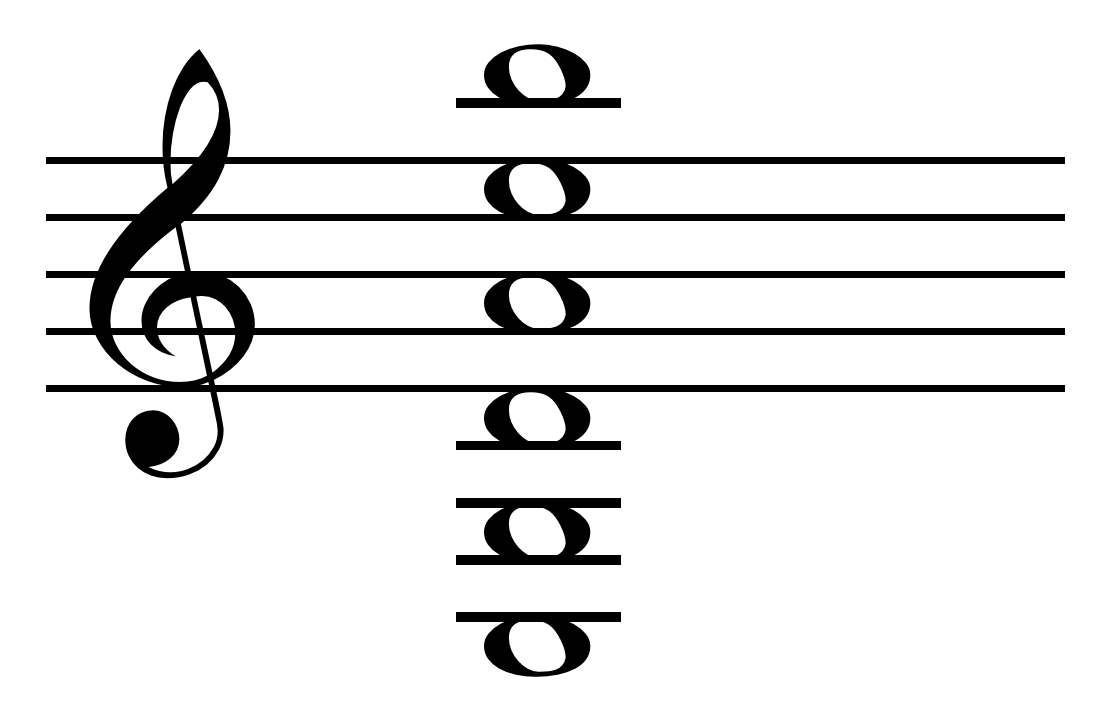
All-fifths tuning

All-fifths tuning refers to the set of tunings for string instruments in which each interval between consecutive open strings is a perfect fifth. All-fifths tuning is the standard tuning for mandolin and violin and it is an alternative tuning for guitars. All-fifths tuning is also called fifths, perfect fifths, or mandoguitar tuning.
