= Parasite (See You Next Tuesday album) =

Studio album by See You Next Tuesday
- Released: April 3, 2007
- Recorded: 2006–2007
- Studio: Planet Red Studios (Richmond, Virginia)
- Genre: Mathcore, deathcore, grindcore
- Length: 18:51
- Label: Ferret
- Producer: Andreas Magnusson

See You Next Tuesday chronology
Summer Sampler EP (2005)	Parasite (2007)	Intervals (2008)

Professional ratings
Review scores
Source	Rating
AllMusic	3/5 stars
Alternative Press	2/5 stars
About.com	3/5 stars

Parasite is the debut studio album by See You Next Tuesday, released on April 3, 2007, on the indie label Ferret. It is also the first release by the band with vocalist Chris Fox. All the song titles (excluding "Paraphilia" and both parts of "Pogonotrophy") are quotes from movies and television shows.

== Background ==
=== Recording ===
To prepare for the album, See You Next Tuesday booked three weeks studio time at Planet Red Studios in Richmond, Virginia. Eight days into the recording process the drums and guitars were completely finished, but a computer crash wiped all the data, which forced the band to essentially record the album from scratch a second time. The next two weeks of their booked studio time were spent re-recording and finishing the record.

=== Artwork ===
The artwork, layout and cover was done by Dutch artist Dennis Sibeijn, who has also done album cover artwork for Job for a Cowboy and Chimaira.

== Track listing ==
No.	Title	Length
1.	"Baby, You Make Me Wish I Had Three Hands"	0:05
2.	"Good Christians Don't Get Jiggy With It 'Til After Marriage"	1:13
3.	"Honey, I've Never Had Sex that Wasn't Awkward"	1:26
4.	"Before I Die, I'm Gonna Fuck Me a Fish"	1:15
5.	"Here, Take this Pill"	1:45
6.	"How to Survive a Vicious Cock Fight"	1:24
7.	"Paraphilia"	2:00
8.	"Just Out of Curiosity, Are Your Parents Siblings?"	0:44
9.	"8 Dead, 9 If You Count the Fetus"	1:18
10.	"Man-Dude vs. Dude-Brah (Where's the Party At?)"	1:04
11.	"Let's Go Halvsies on a Bastard"	1:18
12.	"A Portable Death Ray and a Sterile Claw Hammer"	1:38
13.	"Pogonotrophy: Part I - The Hunter"	0:24
14.	"Pogonotrophy: Part II - The Parasite"	3:17
Total length:		18:51

== Personnel ==
See You Next Tuesday

- Chris Fox − vocals
- Drew Slavik − guitars
- Travis Martin − bass
- Andy Dalton − drums

Production

- Produced, recorded and mixed by Andreas Magnusson
