= Parasite (Fractal Glider album) =

Studio album by Fractal Glider
- Released: 2002
- Genre: Psytrance
- Length: 73:24
- Label: Boom Records
- Producer: Paul McCosh

Parasite is an album released by the band Fractal Glider in 2002. The record was produced by Boom Records, an independent psy-trance label in the Netherlands.

== Track listing ==
1. "Skanda's Tail" - 8:07
2. "Mezmorized" - 8:34
3. "Telementery" - 8:46
4. "Karmic Implications" - 7:13
5. "Language Of Silence" - 9:08
6. "Raspy Honks" - 8:33
7. "Colonization" - 8:33
8. "Witch Doctor" - 8:07
9. "Earth Tremors" - 6:23

== Personnel ==
- Paul McCosh
