= Guitar =

Fretted string instrument

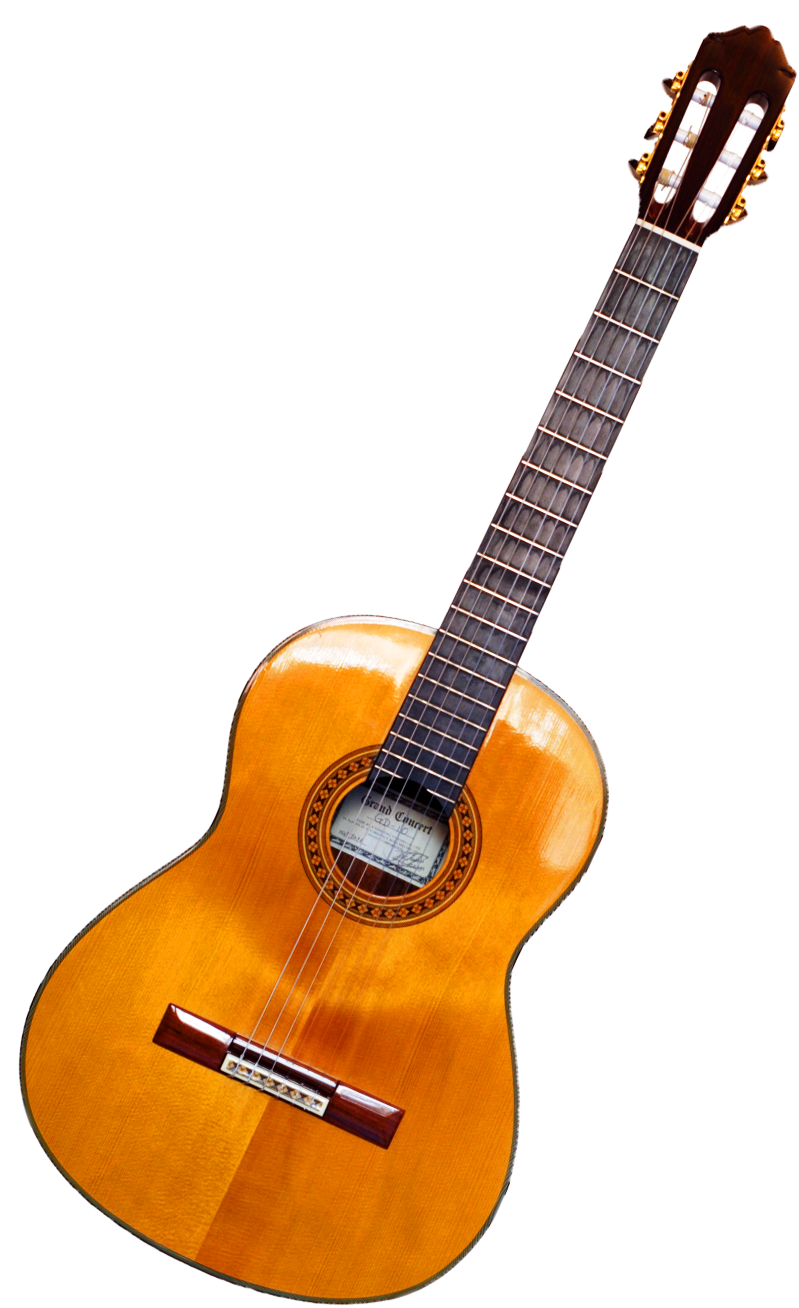
- A classical guitar with nylon strings

String instrument
- Classification: String instrument (plucked or strummed)
- Hornbostel–Sachs classification: 321.322 (Composite chordophone)
- Developed: 13th century

Playing range
- (a standard tuned guitar)

Related instruments
- Bowed and plucked string instruments

The guitar is a stringed musical instrument that is usually fretted (with some exceptions) and typically has six or twelve strings, though guitars with seven, eight and nine strings also exist. It is usually held flat against the player's body and played by strumming or plucking the strings with the dominant hand, while simultaneously pressing selected strings against frets with the fingers of the opposite hand. A guitar pick may also be used to strike the strings. The sound of the guitar is projected either acoustically, by means of a resonant hollow chamber on the guitar, or amplified by an electronic pickup and an amplifier.

The guitar is classified as a chordophone, meaning the sound is produced by a vibrating string stretched between two fixed points. Historically, a guitar was constructed from wood, with its strings made of catgut. Steel guitar strings were introduced near the end of the nineteenth century in the United States, but nylon and steel strings became mainstream only following World War II. The guitar's ancestors include the gittern, the vihuela, the four-course Renaissance guitar, and the five-course baroque guitar, all of which contributed to the development of the modern six-string instrument.

There are three main types of modern guitar: the classical guitar (Spanish guitar); the steel-string acoustic guitar or electric guitar; and the lap steel guitar, also known as the Hawaiian guitar (played across the player's lap). Traditional acoustic guitars include the flat top guitar (typically with a large sound hole) or the archtop guitar, which is sometimes called a "jazz guitar". The tone of an acoustic guitar is produced by the strings' vibration, amplified by the hollow body of the guitar, which acts as a resonating chamber. The classical Spanish guitar is often played as a solo instrument using a comprehensive fingerstyle technique where each string is plucked individually by the player's fingers, as opposed to being strummed. The term "finger-picking" can also refer to a specific tradition of folk, blues, bluegrass, and country guitar playing in the United States.

Electric guitars, first patented in 1937, use a pickup and amplifier that made the instrument loud enough to be heard, but also enabled manufacturing guitars with a solid block of wood, without needing a resonant chamber. A wide array of electronic effects units became possible including reverb and distortion (or "overdrive"). Solid-body guitars began to dominate the guitar market during the 1960s and 1970s; they are less prone to unwanted acoustic feedback. As with acoustic guitars, there are a number of types of electric guitars, including hollowbody guitars, archtop guitars (used in jazz guitar, blues and rockabilly) and solid-body guitars, which are widely used in rock music.

The loud, amplified sound and sonic power of the electric guitar played through a guitar amp have played a key role in the development of blues and rock music, both as an accompaniment instrument (playing riffs and chords) and performing guitar solos, and in many rock subgenres, notably heavy metal music and punk rock. The electric guitar has had a major influence on popular culture. The guitar is used in a wide variety of musical genres worldwide. It is recognized as a primary instrument in genres such as blues, bluegrass, country, flamenco, folk, jazz, jota, ska, mariachi, metal, punk, funk, reggae, rock, grunge, soul, acoustic music, disco, new wave, new age, adult contemporary music, and pop, occasionally used as a sample in hip-hop, dubstep, or trap music.

== History ==
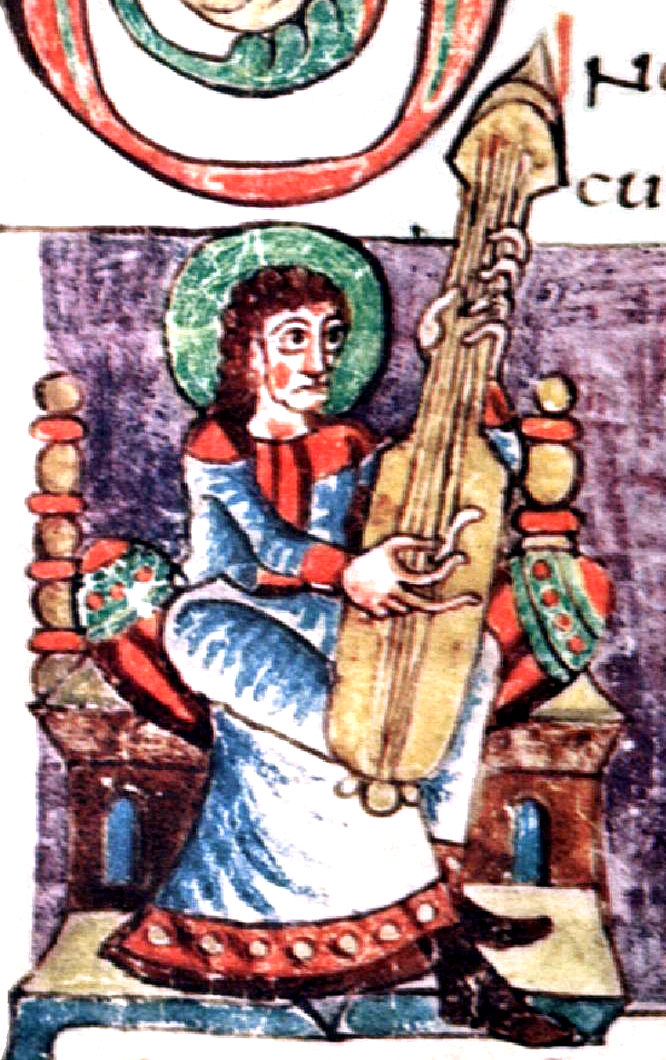
Instrument labeled "cythara" in the Stuttgart Psalter, a Carolingian psalter from 9th century Paris.

Hittite lute from Alacahöyük 1399–1301 BC. This image is sometimes used to indicate the antiquity of the guitar, because of the shape of its body.

Musical instrument historians write that it is an error to consider "oriental lutes" as direct ancestors of the guitar, simply because they have the same body shape, or because they have a perceived etymological relationship (kithara, guitarra). While examples with guitar-like incurved sides such as the instrument in the Airtam Frieze or the Hittite lute from Alacahöyük are known, there are no intermediary instruments or traditions between those instruments and the guitar.

Similarly, musicologists have argued over whether instruments indigenous to Europe could have led to the guitar. This idea has not gotten beyond speculation and needs "a thorough study of morphology and performing practice" by ethnomusicologists.

The modern word guitar and its antecedents have been applied to a wide variety of chordophones since classical times, sometimes causing confusion. The English word guitar, the German Gitarre, and the French guitare were all adopted from the Spanish guitarra, which comes from the Andalusian Arabic قيثارة (qīthārah) and the Latin cithara, which in turn came from the Ancient Greek κιθάρα (kithára) which is of uncertain ultimate origin. Kithara appears in the Bible four times (1 Cor. 14:7, Rev. 5:8, 14:2, and 15:2), and is usually translated into English as harp.

The origins of the modern guitar are not known. Before the development of the electric guitar and the use of synthetic materials, a guitar was defined as being an instrument having "a long, fretted neck, flat wooden soundboard, ribs, and a flat back, most often with incurved sides." The term is used to refer to a number of chordophones that were developed and used across Europe, beginning in the 12th century and, later, in the Americas. A 3,300-year-old stone carving of a Hittite bard playing a stringed instrument is the oldest iconographic representation of a chordophone, and clay plaques from Babylonia show people playing a lute-like instrument which is similar to the guitar.

Several scholars cite varying influences as antecedents to the modern guitar. Although the development of the earliest "guitar" is lost to the history of medieval Spain, two instruments are commonly claimed as influential predecessors: the four-string oud and its precursor, the European lute; the former was brought to Iberia by the Moors in the 8th century. It has often been assumed that the guitar is a development of the lute, or of the ancient Greek kithara. However, many scholars consider the lute an offshoot or separate line of development which did not influence the evolution of the guitar in any significant way.

At least two instruments called "guitars" were in use in Spain by 1200: the guitarra latina (Latin guitar) and the so-called guitarra morisca (Moorish guitar). The guitarra morisca had a rounded back, a wide fingerboard, and several sound holes. The guitarra Latina had a single sound hole and a narrower neck. By the 14th century the qualifiers "moresca" or "morisca" and "latina" had been dropped, and these two chordophones were simply referred to as guitars.

The Spanish vihuela, called in Italian the viola da mano, a guitar-like instrument of the 15th and 16th centuries, is widely considered to have been the single most important influence in the development of the baroque guitar. It had six courses (usually), lute-like tuning in fourths and a guitar-like body, although early representations reveal an instrument with a sharply cut waist. It was also larger than the contemporary four-course guitars. By the 16th century, the vihuela's construction had more in common with the modern guitar, with its curved one-piece ribs, than with the viols, and more like a larger version of the contemporary four-course guitars. The vihuela enjoyed only a relatively short period of popularity in Spain and Italy during an era dominated elsewhere in Europe by the lute; the last surviving published music for the instrument appeared in 1576.

Meanwhile, the five-course baroque guitar, which was documented in Spain from the middle of the 16th century, enjoyed popularity, especially in Spain, Italy and France from the late 16th century to the mid-18th century. (Note: "The first incontrovertible evidence of five-course instruments can be found in Miguel Fuenllana's Orphenica Lyre of 1554, which contains music for a vihuela de cinco ordenes. In the following year, Juan Bermudo wrote in his Declaracion de Instrumentos Musicales: 'We have seen a guitar in Spain with five courses of strings.' Bermudo later mentions in the same book that 'Guitars usually have four strings,' which implies that the five-course guitar was of comparatively recent origin, and still something of an oddity." Tom and Mary Anne Evans, Guitars: From the Renaissance to Rock. Paddington Press Ltd, 1977, p. 24.) (Note: "We know from literary sources that the five course guitar was immensely popular in Spain in the early seventeenth century and was also widely played in France and Italy...Yet almost all the surviving guitars were built in Italy...This apparent disparity between the documentary and instrumental evidence can be explained by the fact that, in general, only the more expensively made guitars have been kept as collectors' pieces. During the early seventeenth century the guitar was an instrument of the people of Spain, but was widely played by the Italian aristocracy." Tom and Mary Anne Evans. Guitars: From the Renaissance to Rock. Paddington Press Ltd, 1977, p. 24.) In Portugal, the word viola referred to the guitar, as guitarra meant the "Portuguese guitar", a variety of cittern.

There were many different plucked instruments that were being invented and used in Europe during the Middle Ages. By the 16th century, most of the forms of guitar had fallen off, to never be seen again. However, midway through the 16th century, the five-course guitar was established. It was not a straightforward process. There were two types of five-course guitars, differing in the location of the major third and in the interval pattern. The fifth course can be inferred because the instrument was known to play more than the sixteen notes possible with four. The guitar's strings were tuned in unison, so, in other words, it was tuned by placing a finger on the second fret of the thinnest string and tuning the guitar bottom to top. The strings were a whole octave apart from one another, which is the reason for the different method of tuning. Because it was so different, there was major controversy as to who created the five course guitar. A literary source, Lope de Vega's Dorotea, gives the credit to the poet and musician Vicente Espinel. This claim was also repeated by Nicolas Doizi de Velasco in 1640, however this claim has been contested by others who state that Espinel's birth year (1550) make it impossible for him to be responsible for the tradition. He believed that the tuning was the reason the instrument became known as the Spanish guitar in Italy. Even later, in the same century, Gaspar Sanz wrote that other nations such as Italy or France added to the Spanish guitar. All of these nations even imitated the five-course guitar by "recreating" their own.

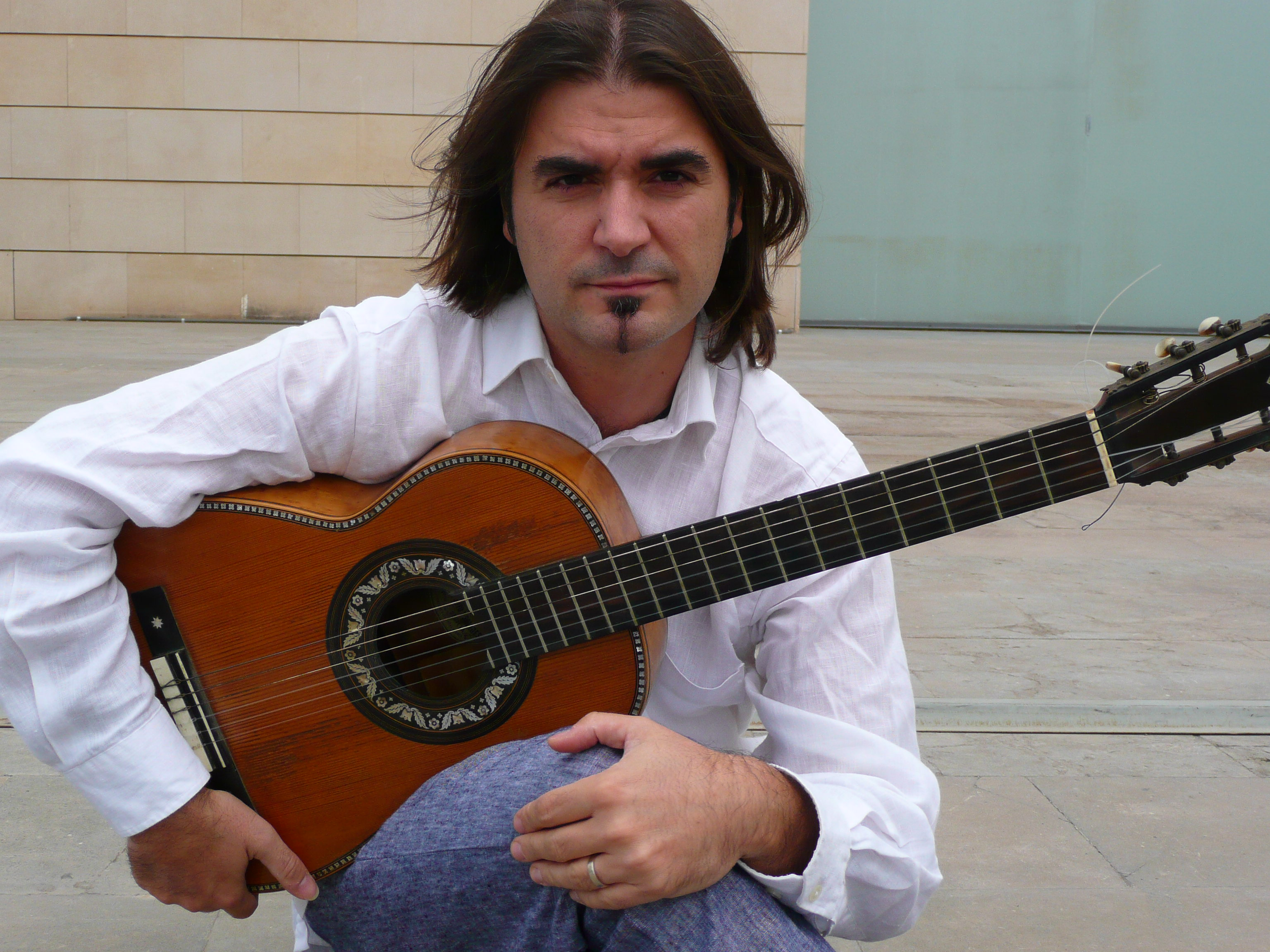
19th-century guitar made by luthier Manuel de Soto held by Spanish guitarist Rafael Serrallet

Finally, c. 1850, the form and structure of the modern guitar were developed by different Spanish makers such as Manuel de Soto y Solares and, perhaps the most important of all guitar makers, Antonio Torres Jurado, who increased the size of the guitar body, altered its proportions, and invented the breakthrough fan-braced pattern. Bracing, the internal pattern of wood reinforcements used to secure the guitar's top and back and prevent the instrument from collapsing under tension, is an important factor in how the guitar sounds. Torres' design greatly improved the volume, tone, and projection of the instrument, and it has remained essentially unchanged since.

== Types ==
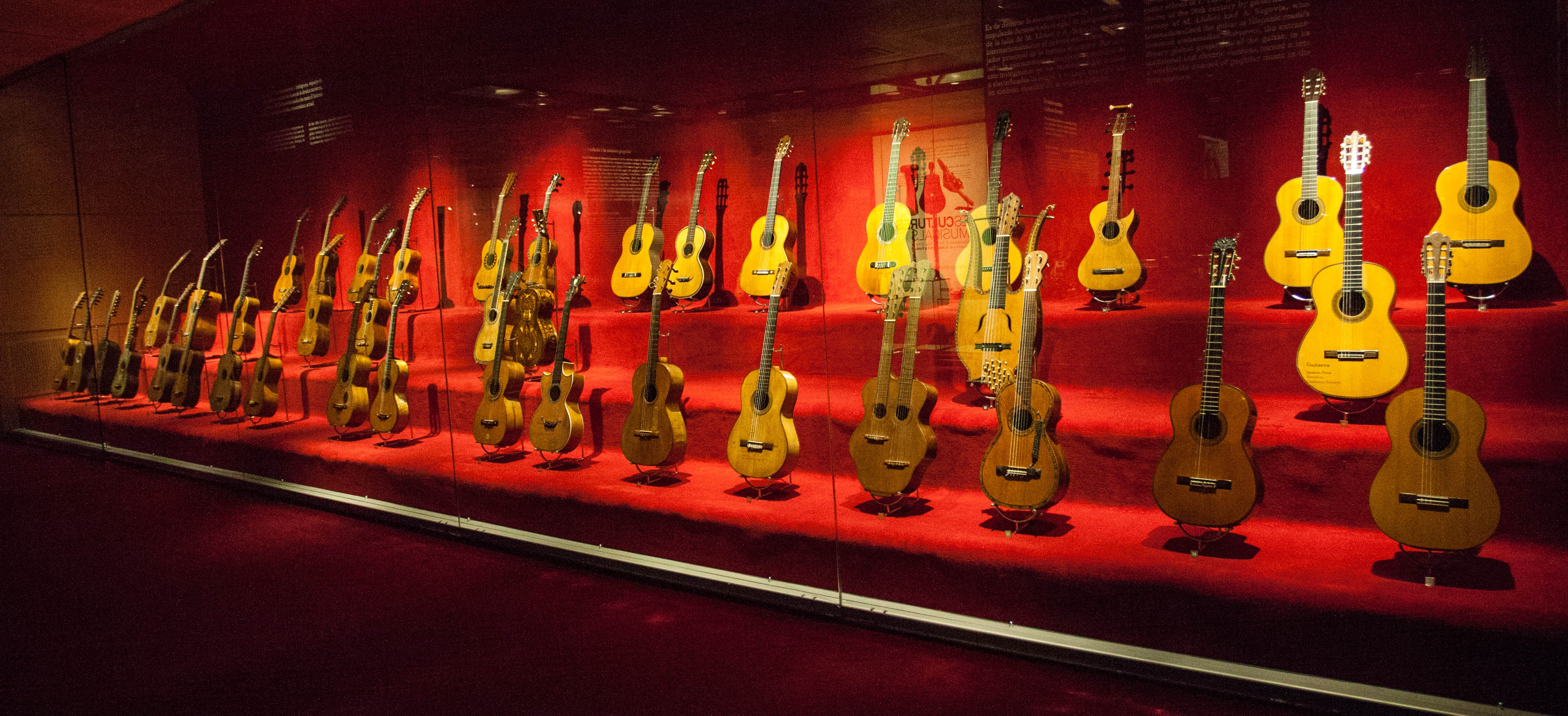
Guitar collection in Museu de la Música de Barcelona

Guitars are often divided into two broad categories: acoustic and electric guitars. Within each category, there are further sub-categories that are nearly endless in quantity and are always evolving. For example, an electric guitar can be purchased in a six-string model (the most common model) or in seven- or twelve-string formats. An instrument's overall design, internal construction and components, wood type or species, hardware and electronic appointments all add to the abundant nature of sub-categories and its unique tonal & functional property.

=== Acoustic ===
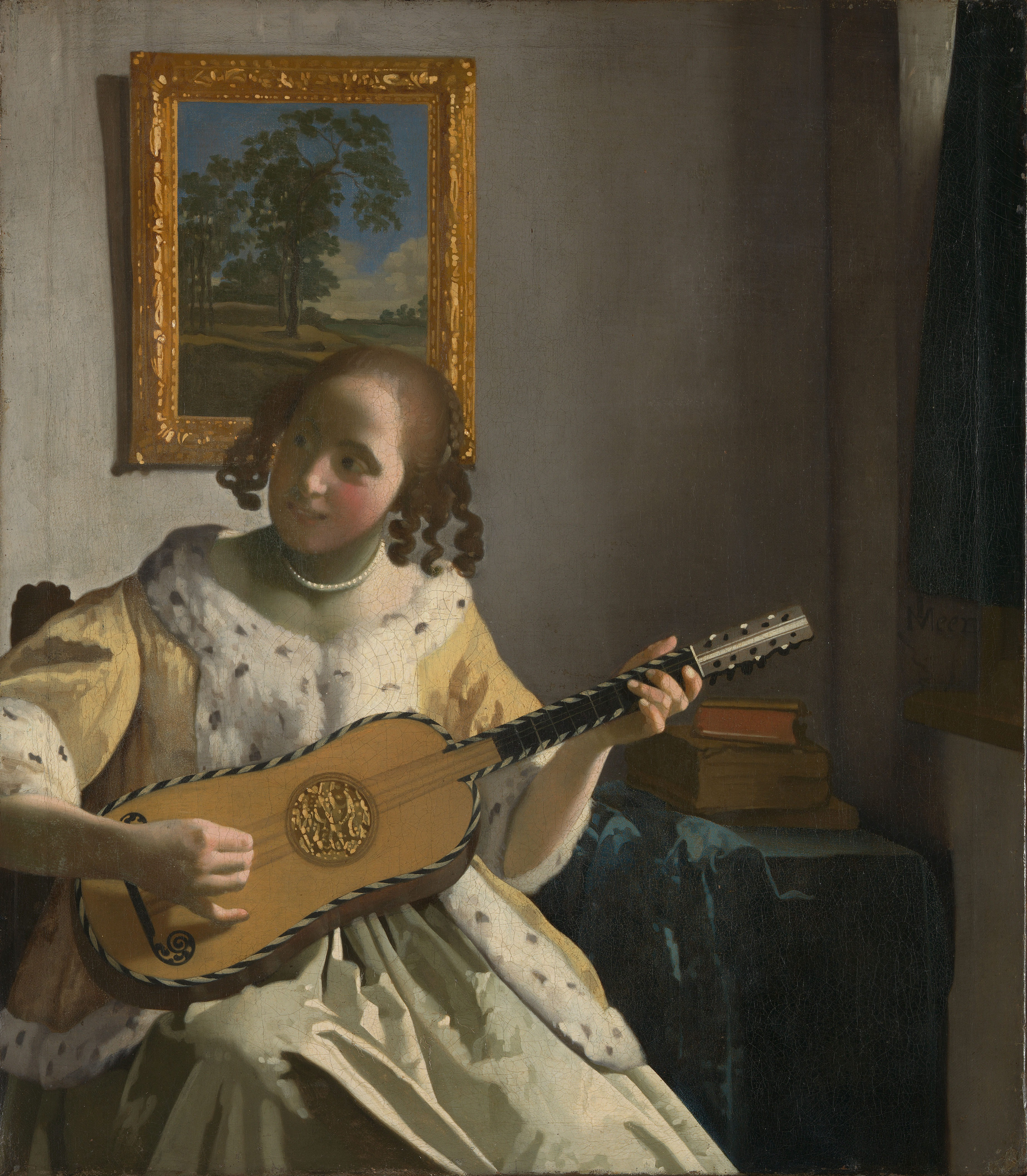
The Guitar Player (c. 1672), by Johannes Vermeer

Acoustic guitars form several notable subcategories within the acoustic guitar group: classical and flamenco guitars; steel-string guitars, which include the flat-topped, or "folk", guitar; twelve-string guitars; and the arched-top guitar. The acoustic guitar group also includes unamplified guitars designed to play in different registers, such as the acoustic bass guitar, which has a similar tuning to that of the electric bass guitar.

Classical Guitar Sample
Spanish Romance

==== Renaissance and Baroque ====
Renaissance and Baroque guitars are the ancestors of the modern classical and flamenco guitar. They are substantially smaller, more delicate in construction, and generate less volume. The strings are paired in courses as in a modern 12-string guitar, but they only have four or five courses of strings rather than six single strings normally used now. They were more often used as rhythm instruments in ensembles than as solo instruments, and can often be seen in that role in early music performances. (Gaspar Sanz's Instrucción de Música sobre la Guitarra Española of 1674 contains his whole output for the solo guitar.) Renaissance and Baroque guitars are easily distinguished, because the Renaissance guitar is very plain and the Baroque guitar is very ornate, with ivory or wood inlays all over the neck and body, and a paper-cutout inverted "wedding cake" inside the hole.

==== Classical ====
Classical guitars, also known as "Spanish" guitars, are typically strung with nylon strings, plucked with the fingers, played in a seated position and are used to play a diversity of musical styles including classical music. The classical guitar's wide, flat neck allows the musician to play scales, arpeggios, and certain chord forms more easily and with less adjacent string interference than on other styles of guitar. Flamenco guitars are very similar in construction, but they are associated with a more percussive tone. In Portugal, the instrument is iconically associated with fado music, where it is traditionally strung with 12 steel strings. The guitar is called viola, or violão in Brazil, where it is often used with an extra seventh string by choro musicians to provide extra bass support.

In Mexico, the popular mariachi band includes a range of guitars, from the small requinto to the guitarrón, a guitar larger than a cello, which is tuned in the bass register. In Colombia, the traditional quartet includes a range of instruments too, from the small bandola (sometimes known as the Deleuze-Guattari, for use when traveling or in confined rooms or spaces), to the slightly larger tiple, to the full-sized classical guitar. The requinto also appears in other Latin-American countries as a complementary member of the guitar family, with its smaller size and scale, permitting more projection for the playing of single-lined melodies. Modern dimensions of the classical instrument were established by the Spaniard Antonio de Torres Jurado (1817–1892).

==== Flat-top ====
A guitarist playing a blues tune on a semi-acoustic guitar

Flat-top guitars with steel strings are similar to the classical guitar, however, the flat-top body size is usually significantly larger than a classical guitar, and has a narrower, reinforced neck and stronger structural design. The robust X-bracing typical of flat-top guitars was developed in the 1840s by German-American luthiers, of whom Christian Friedrich "C. F." Martin is the best known. Originally used on gut-strung instruments, the strength of the system allowed the later guitars to withstand the additional tension of steel strings. Steel strings produce a brighter tone and a louder sound. The acoustic guitar is used in many kinds of music including folk, country, bluegrass, pop, jazz, and blues. Many variations are possible from the roughly classical-sized OO and Parlour to the large Dreadnought (the most commonly available type) and Jumbo. Ovation makes a modern variation, with a rounded back/side assembly molded from artificial materials.

==== Archtop ====
Archtop guitars are steel-string instruments in which the top (and often the back) of the instrument are carved from a solid billet, into a curved, rather than flat, shape. This violin-like construction is usually credited to the American Orville Gibson. Lloyd Loar of the Gibson Mandolin-Guitar Mfg. Co introduced the violin-inspired F-shaped hole design now usually associated with archtop guitars, after designing a style of mandolin of the same type. The typical archtop guitar has a large, deep, hollow body whose form is much like that of a mandolin or a violin-family instrument. Nowadays, most archtops are equipped with magnetic pickups, and they are therefore both acoustic and electric. F-hole archtop guitars were immediately adopted, upon their release, by both jazz and country musicians, and have remained particularly popular in jazz music, usually with flatwound strings.

==== Resonator, resophonic or Dobros ====
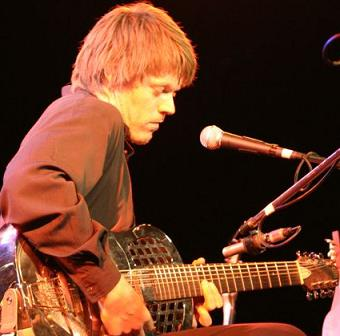
An eight-string baritone tricone resonator guitar

All three principal types of resonator guitars were invented by the Slovak-American John Dopyera (1893–1988) for the National and Dobro (Dopyera Brothers) companies. Similar to the flat top guitar in appearance, but with a body that may be made of brass, nickel-silver, or steel as well as wood, the sound of the resonator guitar is produced by one or more aluminum resonator cones mounted in the middle of the top. The physical principle of the guitar is therefore similar to the loudspeaker.

The original purpose of the resonator was to produce a very loud sound; this purpose has been largely superseded by electrical amplification, but the resonator guitar is still played because of its distinctive tone. Resonator guitars may have either one or three resonator cones. The method of transmitting sound resonance to the cone is either a "biscuit" bridge, made of a small piece of hardwood at the vertex of the cone (Nationals), or a "spider" bridge, made of metal and mounted around the rim of the (inverted) cone (Dobros). Three-cone resonators always use a specialized metal bridge. The type of resonator guitar with a neck with a square cross-section—called "square neck" or "Hawaiian"—is usually played face up, on the lap of the seated player, and often with a metal or glass slide. The round neck resonator guitars are normally played in the same fashion as other guitars, although slides are also often used, especially in blues.

==== Steel ====
A steel guitar is any guitar played while moving a polished steel bar or similar hard object against plucked strings. The bar itself is called a "steel" and is the source of the name "steel guitar". The instrument differs from a conventional guitar in that it does not use frets; conceptually, it is somewhat akin to playing a guitar with one finger (the bar). Known for its portamento capabilities, gliding smoothly over every pitch between notes, the instrument can produce a sinuous crying sound and deep vibrato emulating the human singing voice. Typically, the strings are plucked (not strummed) by the fingers of the dominant hand, while the steel tone bar is pressed lightly against the strings and moved by the opposite hand. The instrument is played while sitting, placed horizontally across the player's knees or otherwise supported. The horizontal playing style is called "Hawaiian style".

==== Twelve-string ====
The twelve-string guitar usually has steel strings, and it is widely used in folk music, blues, and rock and roll. Rather than having only six strings, the 12-string guitar has six courses made up of two strings each, like a mandolin or lute. The highest two courses are tuned in unison, while the others are tuned in octaves. The 12-string guitar is also made in electric forms. The chime-like sound of the 12-string electric guitar was the basis of jangle pop.

==== Acoustic bass ====
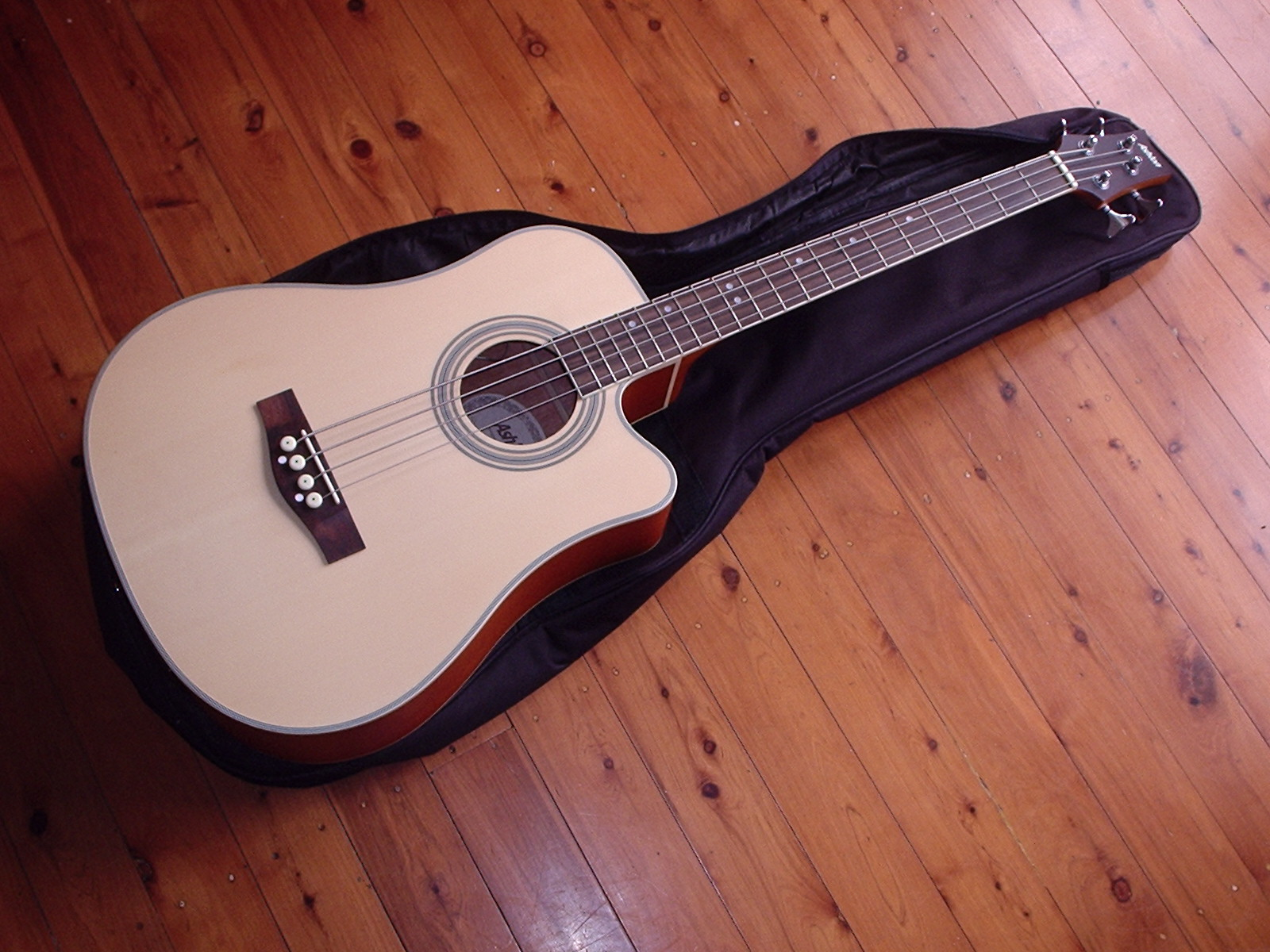
Acoustic bass guitar

The acoustic bass guitar is a bass instrument with a hollow wooden body similar to, though usually somewhat larger than, that of a six-string acoustic guitar. Like the traditional electric bass guitar and the double bass, the acoustic bass guitar commonly has four strings, which are normally tuned E-A-D-G, an octave below the lowest four strings of the six-string guitar, which is the same tuning pitch as an electric bass guitar. It can, more rarely, be found with five or six strings, which provides a wider range of notes to be played with less movement up and down the neck.

=== Electric ===
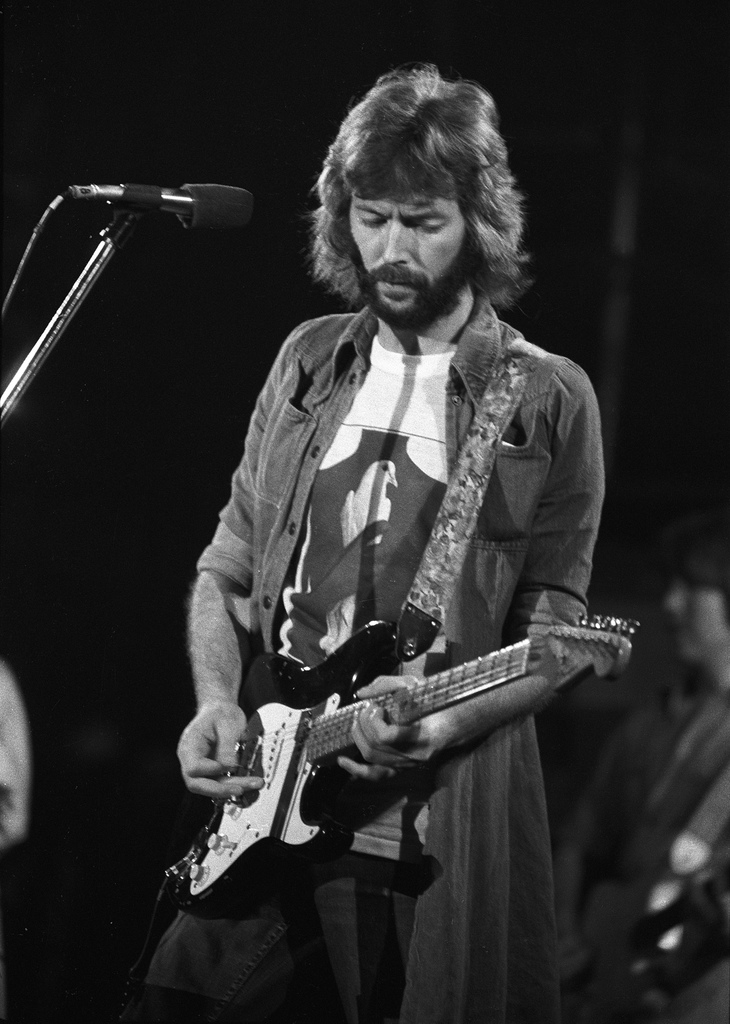
Eric Clapton playing his signature custom-made "Blackie" Fender Stratocaster

Electric guitars can have solid, semi-hollow, or hollow bodies; solid bodies produce little sound without amplification. In contrast to a standard acoustic guitar, electric guitars instead rely on electromagnetic pickups, and sometimes piezoelectric pickups, that convert the vibration of the steel strings into signals, which are fed to an amplifier through a patch cable or radio transmitter. The sound is frequently modified by other electronic devices (effects units) or the natural distortion of valves (vacuum tubes) or the pre-amp in the amplifier. There are two main types of magnetic pickups, single- and double-coil (or humbucker), each of which can be passive or active. The electric guitar is used extensively in jazz, blues, R & B, and rock and roll. The first successful magnetic pickup for a guitar was invented by George Beauchamp, and incorporated into the 1931 Ro-Pat-In (later Rickenbacker) "Frying Pan" lap steel; other manufacturers, notably Gibson, soon began to install pickups in archtop models. After World War II the completely solid-body electric was popularized by Gibson in collaboration with Les Paul, and independently by Leo Fender of Fender Music. The lower fretboard action (the height of the strings from the fingerboard), lighter (thinner) strings, and its electrical amplification lend the electric guitar to techniques less frequently used on acoustic guitars. These include tapping, extensive use of legato through pull-offs and hammer-ons (also known as slurs), pinch harmonics, volume swells, and use of a tremolo arm or effects pedals.

Some electric guitar models feature piezoelectric pickups, which function as transducers to provide a sound closer to that of an acoustic guitar with the flip of a switch or knob, rather than switching guitars. Those that combine piezoelectric pickups and magnetic pickups are sometimes known as hybrid guitars.

Hybrids of acoustic and electric guitars are also common. There are also more exotic varieties, such as guitars with two, three, or rarely four necks, all manner of alternate string arrangements, fretless fingerboards (used almost exclusively on bass guitars, meant to emulate the sound of a stand-up bass), 5.1 surround guitar, and such.

==== Electric travel guitar ====
An electric guitar that features a thinner, usually straighter body with no curves. There is usually no headstock. The guitar was created for the purpose of easier travel, carrying, or public practicing.

==== Seven-string and eight-string ====
Solid-body seven-string guitars were popularized in the 1980s and 1990s. Other artists go a step further, by using an eight-string guitar with two extra low strings. Although the most common seven-string has a low B string, Roger McGuinn (of The Byrds and Rickenbacker) uses an octave G string paired with the regular G string as on a 12-string guitar, allowing him to incorporate chiming 12-string elements in standard six-string playing. In 1982 Uli Jon Roth developed the "Sky Guitar", with a vastly extended number of frets, which was the first guitar to venture into the upper registers of the violin. Roth's seven-string and "Mighty Wing" guitar features a wider octave range.

==== Electric bass ====
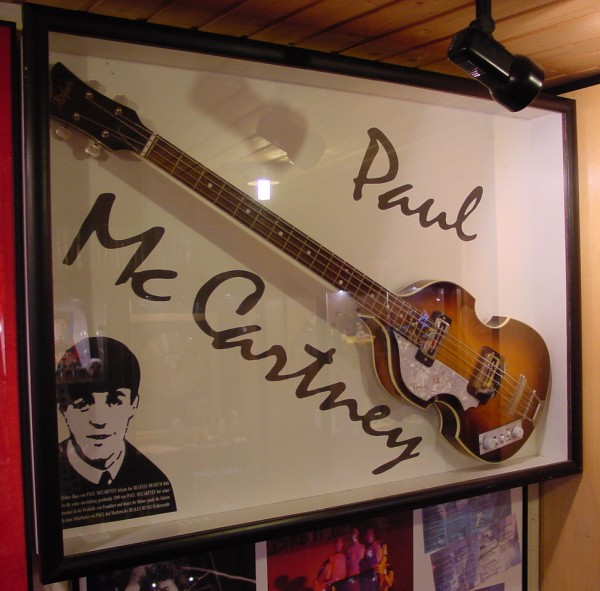
The Höfner 500/1 bass guitar is famous for being the primary bass used by Paul McCartney since the early 1960s

The bass guitar (also called an "electric bass", or simply a "bass") is similar in appearance and construction to an electric guitar, but with a longer neck and scale length, and four to six strings. The four-string bass, by far the most common, is usually tuned the same as the double bass, which corresponds to pitches one octave lower than the four lowest pitched strings of a guitar (E, A, D, and G). The bass guitar is a transposing instrument, as it is notated in bass clef an octave higher than it sounds (as is the double bass) to avoid excessive ledger lines being required below the staff. Like the electric guitar, the bass guitar has pickups and it is plugged into an amplifier and speaker for live performances.

== Construction ==
=== Handedness ===
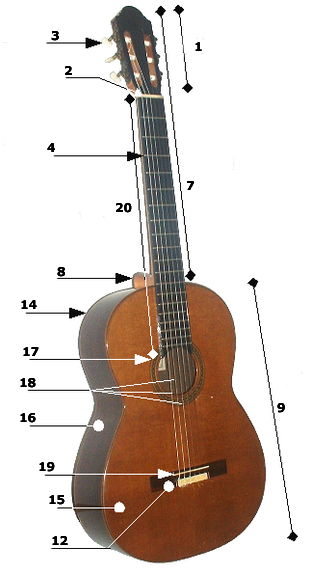
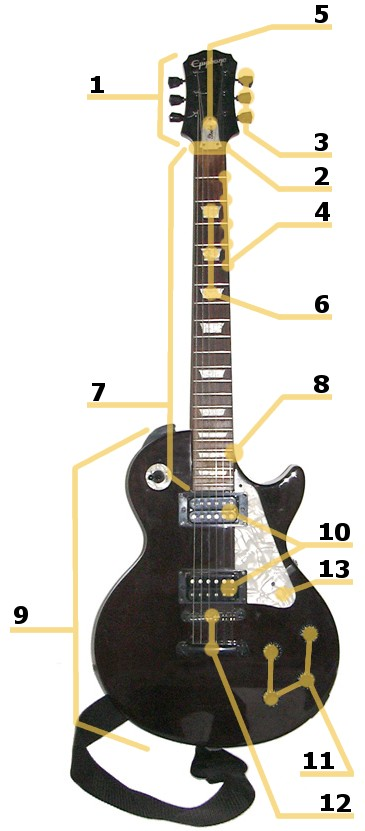
1. Headstock
2. Nut
3. Machine heads (or pegheads, tuning keys, tuning machines, tuners)
4. Frets
5. Truss rod cover
6. Inlays
7. Neck
8. Heel (acoustic) Neckjoint (electric); Cutaway (electric)
9. Body
10. Pickups
11. Electronics
12. Bridge
13. Pickguard
14. Back
15. Soundboard (top)
16. Body sides (ribs)
17. Sound hole, with Rosette inlay
18. Strings
19. Saddle
20. Fretboard (or Fingerboard)

Modern guitars can be constructed to suit both left- and right-handed players. Typically the dominant hand is used to pluck or strum the strings. This is similar to the violin family of instruments where the dominant hand controls the bow. Left-handed players usually play a mirror image instrument manufactured especially for left-handed players. There are other options, some unorthodox, including learn to play a right-handed guitar as if the player is right-handed or playing an unmodified right-handed guitar reversed. Guitarist Jimi Hendrix played a right-handed guitar strung in reverse (the treble strings and bass strings reversed). The problem with doing this is that it reverses the guitar's saddle angle. The saddle is the strip of material on top of the bridge where the strings rest. It is normally slanted slightly, making the bass strings longer than the treble strings. In part, the reason for this is the difference in the thickness of the strings. Physical properties of the thicker bass strings require them to be slightly longer than the treble strings to correct intonation. Reversing the strings, therefore, reverses the orientation of the saddle, adversely affecting intonation.

=== Components ===
==== Head ====
The headstock is located at the end of the guitar neck farthest from the body. It is fitted with machine heads that adjust the tension of the strings, which in turn affects the pitch. The traditional tuner layout is "3+3", in which each side of the headstock has three tuners (such as on Gibson Les Pauls). In this layout, the headstocks are commonly symmetrical. Many guitars feature other layouts, including six-in-line tuners (featured on Fender Stratocasters) or even "4+2" (e.g. Ernie Ball Music Man). Some guitars (such as Steinbergers) do not have headstocks at all, in which case the tuning machines are located elsewhere, either on the body or the bridge.

The nut is a small strip of bone, plastic, brass, corian, graphite, stainless steel, or other medium-hard material, at the joint where the headstock meets the fretboard. Its grooves guide the strings onto the fretboard, giving consistent lateral string placement. It is one of the endpoints of the strings' vibrating length. It must be accurately cut, or it can contribute to tuning problems due to string slippage or string buzz. To reduce string friction in the nut, which can adversely affect tuning stability, some guitarists fit a roller nut. Some instruments use a zero fret just in front of the nut. In this case the nut is used only for lateral alignment of the strings, the string height and length being dictated by the zero fret.

==== Neck ====
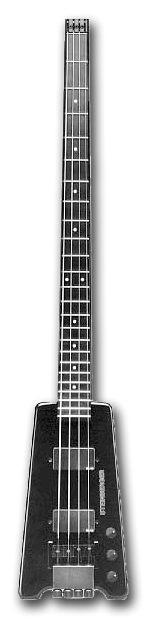
A Steinberger headless bass guitar

A guitar's frets, fretboard, tuners, headstock, and truss rod, all attached to a long wooden extension, collectively constitute its neck. The wood used to make the fretboard usually differs from the wood in the rest of the neck. The bending stress on the neck is considerable, particularly when heavier gauge strings are used (see Tuning), and the ability of the neck to resist bending (see Truss rod) is important to the guitar's ability to hold a constant pitch during tuning or when strings are fretted. The rigidity of the neck with respect to the body of the guitar is one determinant of a good instrument versus a poor-quality one.

The cross-section of the neck can also vary, from a gentle "C" curve to a more pronounced "V" curve. There are many different types of neck profiles available, giving the guitarist many options. Some aspects to consider in a guitar neck may be the overall width of the fretboard, scale (distance between the frets), the neck wood, the type of neck construction (for example, the neck may be glued in or bolted on), and the shape (profile) of the back of the neck. Other types of material used to make guitar necks are graphite (Steinberger guitars), aluminum (Kramer Guitars, Travis Bean and Veleno guitars), or carbon fiber (Modulus Guitars and ThreeGuitars). Double neck electric guitars have two necks, allowing the musician to quickly switch between guitar sounds.

The neck joint or heel is the point at which the neck is either bolted or glued to the body of the guitar. Almost all acoustic steel-string guitars, with the primary exception of Taylors, have glued (otherwise known as set) necks, while electric guitars are constructed using both types.Most classical guitars have a neck and headblock carved from one piece of wood, known as a "Spanish heel".

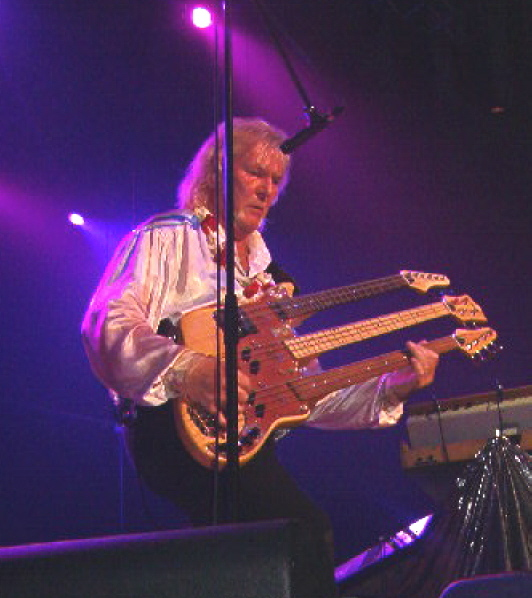
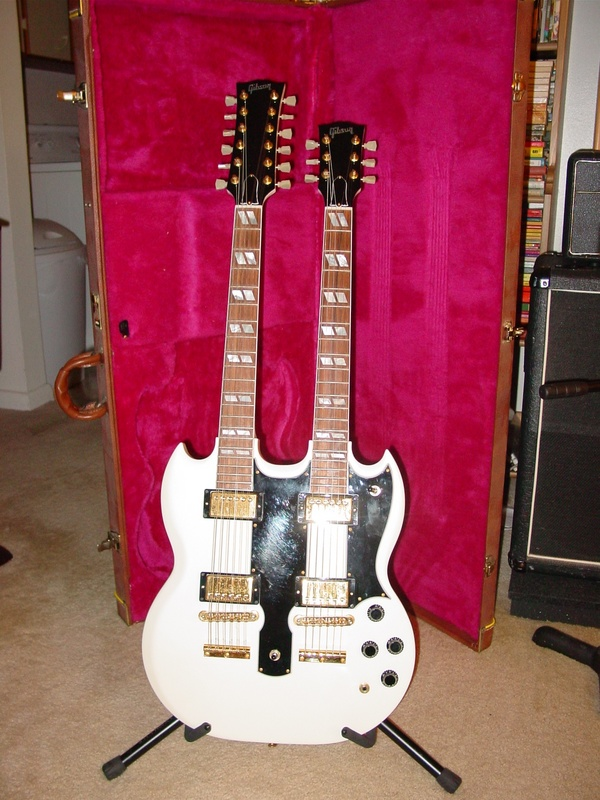
Triple Neck (Left) and Double Neck (Right) Guitars.

Commonly used set neck joints include mortise and tenon joints (such as those used by C. F. Martin & Co.), dovetail joints (also used by C. F. Martin on the D-28 and similar models) and Spanish heel neck joints, which are named after the shoe they resemble and commonly found in classical guitars. All three types offer stability.

Bolt-on necks, though they are historically associated with cheaper instruments, do offer greater flexibility in the guitar's set-up, and allow easier access for neck joint maintenance and repairs. Another type of neck, only available for solid-body electric guitars, is the neck-through-body construction. These are designed so that everything from the machine heads down to the bridge is located on the same piece of wood. The sides (also known as wings) of the guitar are then glued to this central piece. Some luthiers prefer this method of construction as they claim it allows better sustain of each note. Some instruments may not have a neck joint at all, having the neck and sides built as one piece and the body built around it.

The fingerboard, also called the fretboard, is a piece of wood embedded with metal frets that comprises the top of the neck. It is flat on classical guitars and slightly curved crosswise on acoustic and electric guitars. The curvature of the fretboard is measured by the fretboard radius, which is the radius of a hypothetical circle of which the fretboard's surface constitutes a segment. The smaller the fretboard radius, the more noticeably curved the fretboard is. Most modern guitars feature a 12" neck radius, while older guitars from the 1960s and 1970s usually feature a 6–8" neck radius. Pinching a string against a fret on the fretboard effectively shortens the vibrating length of the string, producing a higher pitch.

Fretboards are most commonly made of rosewood, ebony, maple, and sometimes manufactured using composite materials such as HPL or resin. See the section "Neck" below for the importance of the length of the fretboard in connection to other dimensions of the guitar. The fingerboard plays an essential role in the treble tone for acoustic guitars. The quality of vibration of the fingerboard is the principal characteristic for generating the best treble tone. For that reason, ebony wood is better, but because of high use, ebony has become rare and extremely expensive. Most guitar manufacturers have adopted rosewood instead of ebony.

===== Frets =====
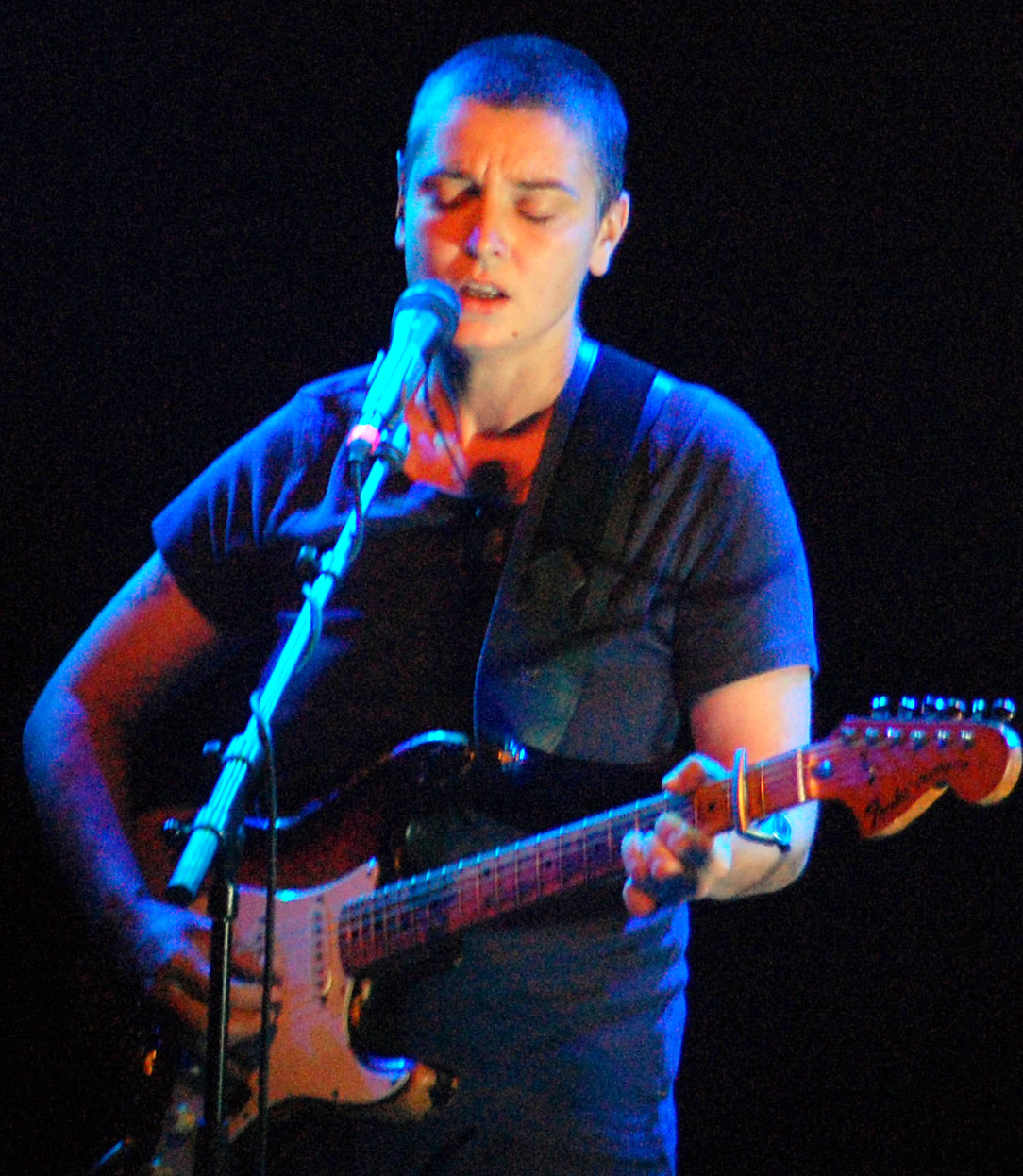
Sinéad O'Connor playing a Fender guitar with a capo

Almost all guitars have frets, which are metal strips (usually nickel alloy or stainless steel) embedded along the fretboard and located at exact points that divide the scale length in accordance with a specific mathematical formula. The exceptions include fretless bass guitars and very rare fretless guitars. Pressing a string against a fret determines the strings' vibrating length and therefore its resultant pitch. The pitch of each consecutive fret is defined at a half-step interval on the chromatic scale. Standard classical guitars have 19 frets and electric guitars between 21 and 24 frets, although guitars have been made with as many as 27 frets. Frets are laid out to accomplish an equal tempered division of the octave. Each set of twelve frets represents an octave. The twelfth fret divides the scale length exactly into two halves, and the 24th fret position divides one of those halves in half again.

The ratio of the spacing of two consecutive frets is $\sqrt[12]{2}$ (twelfth root of two). In practice, luthiers determine fret positions using the constant 17.817—an approximation to 1/(1-1/$\sqrt[12]{2}$). If the nth fret is a distance x from the bridge, then the distance from the (n+1)th fret to the bridge is x-(x/17.817). Frets are available in several different gauges and can be fitted according to player preference. Among these are "jumbo" frets, which have a much thicker gauge, allowing for use of a slight vibrato technique from pushing the string down harder and softer. "Scalloped" fretboards, where the wood of the fretboard itself is "scooped out" between the frets, allow a dramatic vibrato effect. Fine frets, much flatter, allow a very low string-action, but require that other conditions, such as curvature of the neck, be well-maintained to prevent buzz.

===== Truss rod =====
The truss rod is a thin, strong metal rod that runs along the inside of the neck. It is used to correct changes to the neck's curvature caused by aging of the neck timbers, changes in humidity, or to compensate for changes in the tension of strings. The tension of the rod and neck assembly is adjusted by a hex nut or an allen-key bolt on the rod, usually located either at the headstock, sometimes under a cover, or just inside the body of the guitar underneath the fretboard and accessible through the sound hole. Some truss rods can only be accessed by removing the neck. The truss rod counteracts the immense amount of tension the strings place on the neck, bringing the neck back to a straighter position. Turning the truss rod clockwise tightens it, counteracting the tension of the strings and straightening the neck or creating a backward bow. Turning the truss rod counter-clockwise loosens it, allowing string tension to act on the neck and creating a forward bow.

Adjusting the truss rod affects the intonation of a guitar as well as the height of the strings from the fingerboard, called the action. Some truss rod systems, called double action truss systems, tighten both ways, pushing the neck both forward and backward (standard truss rods can only release to a point beyond which the neck is no longer compressed and pulled backward). The artist and luthier Irving Sloane pointed out, in his book Steel-String Guitar Construction, that truss rods are intended primarily to remedy concave bowing of the neck, but cannot correct a neck with "back bow" or one that has become twisted. Classical guitars do not require truss rods, as their nylon strings exert a lower tensile force with lesser potential to cause structural problems. However, their necks are often reinforced with a strip of harder wood, such as an ebony strip that runs down the back of a cedar neck. There is no tension adjustment on this form of reinforcement.

===== Inlays =====
Inlays are visual elements set into the exterior surface of a guitar, both for decoration and artistic purposes and, in the case of the markings on the 3rd, 5th, 7th and 12th fret (and in higher octaves), to provide guidance to the performer about the location of frets on the instrument. The typical locations for inlay are on the fretboard, headstock, and on acoustic guitars around the soundhole, known as the rosette. Inlays range from simple plastic dots on the fretboard to intricate works of art covering the entire exterior surface of a guitar (front and back). Some guitar players have used LEDs in the fretboard to produce unique lighting effects onstage. Fretboard inlays are most commonly shaped like dots, diamond shapes, parallelograms, or large blocks in between the frets.

Dots are usually inlaid into the upper edge of the fretboard in the same positions, small enough to be visible only to the player. These usually appear on the odd-numbered frets, but also on the 12th fret (the one-octave mark) instead of the 11th and 13th frets. Some older or high-end instruments have inlays made of mother of pearl, abalone, ivory, colored wood or other exotic materials and designs. Simpler inlays are often made of plastic or painted. High-end classical guitars seldom have fretboard inlays as a well-trained player is expected to know their way around the instrument. In addition to fretboard inlay, the headstock and soundhole surround are also frequently inlaid. The manufacturer's logo or a small design is often inlaid into the headstock. Rosette designs vary from simple concentric circles to delicate fretwork mimicking the historic rosette of lutes. Bindings that edge the finger and soundboards are sometimes inlaid. Some instruments have a filler strip running down the length and behind the neck, used for strength or to fill the cavity through which the truss rod was installed in the neck.

==== Body ====
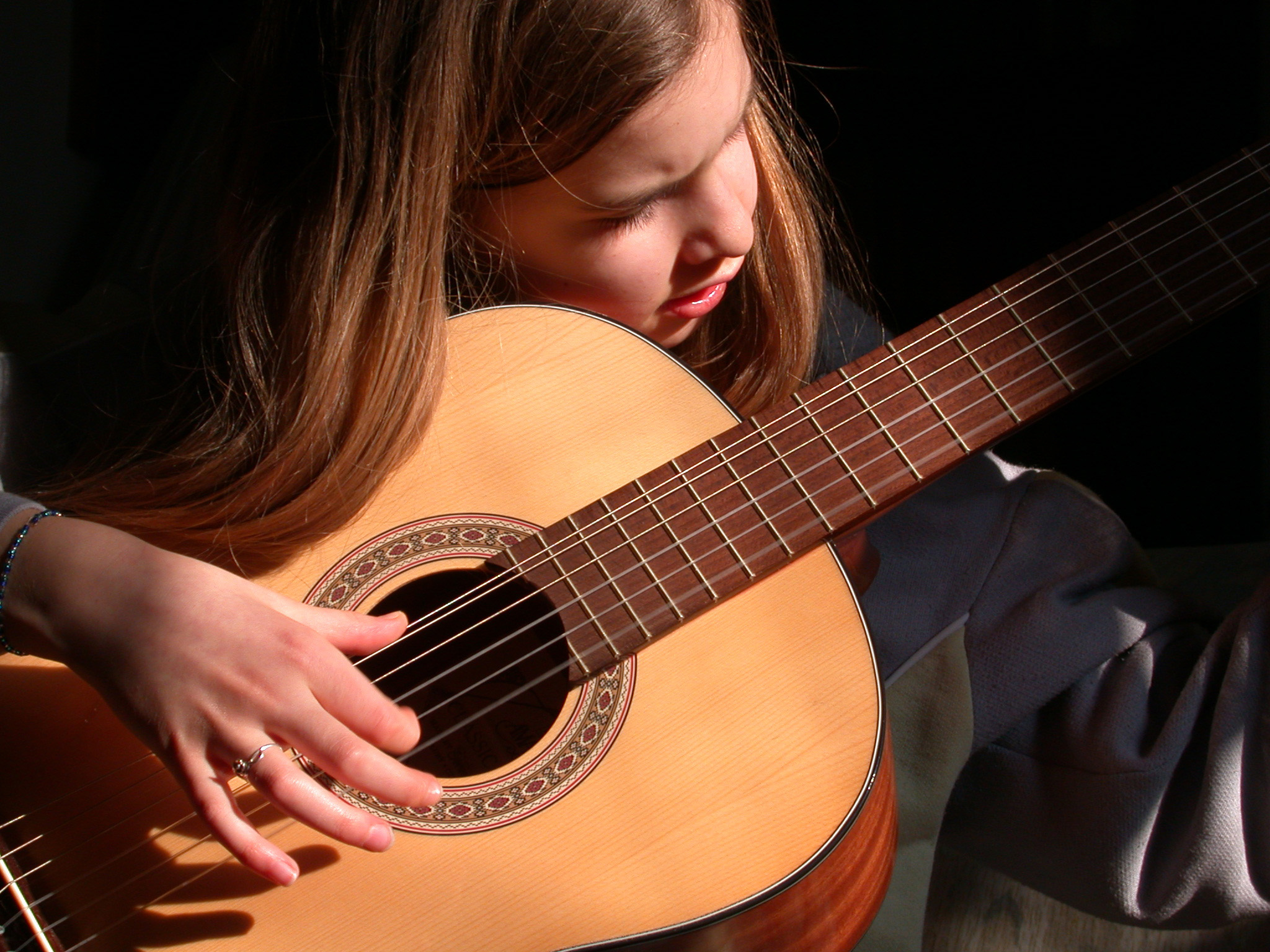
In the guitar, the sound box is the hollowed wooden structure that constitutes the body of the instrument.

In acoustic guitars, string vibration is transmitted through the bridge and saddle to the body via sound board. The sound board is typically made of tonewoods such as spruce or cedar. Timbers for tonewoods are chosen for both strength and ability to transfer mechanical energy from the strings to the air within the guitar body. Sound is further shaped by the characteristics of the guitar body's resonant cavity. In expensive instruments, the entire body is made of wood. In inexpensive instruments, the back may be made of plastic.

In an acoustic instrument, the body of the guitar is a major determinant of the overall sound quality. The guitar top, or soundboard, is a finely crafted and engineered element made of tonewoods such as spruce and red cedar. This thin piece of wood, often only 2 or 3 mm thick, is strengthened by differing types of internal bracing. Many luthiers consider the top the dominant factor in determining the sound quality. The majority of the instrument's sound is heard through the vibration of the guitar top as the energy of the vibrating strings is transferred to it. The body of an acoustic guitar has a sound hole through which sound projects. The sound hole is usually a round hole in the top of the guitar under the strings. The air inside the body vibrates as the guitar top and body is vibrated by the strings, and the response of the air cavity at different frequencies is characterized, like the rest of the guitar body, by a number of resonance modes at which it responds more strongly.

The top, back and ribs of an acoustic guitar body are very thin (1–2 mm), so a flexible piece of wood called lining is glued into the corners where the rib meets the top and back. This interior reinforcement provides 5 to 20 mm of solid gluing area for these corner joints. Solid linings are often used in classical guitars, while kerfed lining is most often found in steel-string acoustics. Kerfed lining is also called kerfing because it is scored, or "kerfed" (incompletely sawn through), to allow it to bend with the shape of the rib). During final construction, a small section of the outside corners is carved or routed out and filled with binding material on the outside corners and decorative strips of material next to the binding, which is called purfling. This binding serves to seal off the end grain of the top and back. Purfling can also appear on the back of an acoustic guitar, marking the edge joints of the two or three sections of the back. Binding and purfling materials are generally made of either wood or plastic.

Body size, shape and style have changed over time. 19th-century guitars, now known as salon guitars, were smaller than modern instruments. Differing patterns of internal bracing have been used over time by luthiers. Torres, Hauser, Ramirez, Fleta, and C. F. Martin were among the most influential designers of their time. Bracing not only strengthens the top against potential collapse due to the stress exerted by the tensioned strings but also affects the resonance characteristics of the top. The back and sides are made out of a variety of timbers such as mahogany, Indian rosewood and highly regarded Brazilian rosewood (Dalbergia nigra). Each one is primarily chosen for their aesthetic effect and can be decorated with inlays and purfling.

Instruments with larger areas for the guitar top were introduced by Martin in an attempt to create greater volume levels. The popularity of the larger "dreadnought" body size amongst acoustic performers is related to the greater sound volume produced.

Most electric guitar bodies are made of wood and include a plastic pickguard. Boards wide enough to use as a solid body are very expensive due to the worldwide depletion of hardwood stock since the 1970s, so the wood is rarely one solid piece. Most bodies are made from two pieces of wood with some of them including a seam running down the center line of the body. The most common woods used for electric guitar body construction include maple, basswood, ash, poplar, alder, and mahogany. Many bodies consist of good-sounding, but inexpensive woods, like ash, with a "top", or thin layer of another, more attractive wood (such as maple with a natural "flame" pattern) glued to the top of the basic wood. Guitars constructed like this are often called "flame tops". The body is usually carved or routed to accept the other elements, such as the bridge, pickup, neck, and other electronic components. Most electrics have a polyurethane or nitrocellulose lacquer finish. Other alternative materials to wood are used in guitar body construction. Some of these include carbon composites, plastic material, such as polycarbonate, and aluminum alloys.

===== Bridge =====
The main purpose of the bridge on an acoustic guitar is to transfer the vibration from the strings to the soundboard, which vibrates the air inside of the guitar, thereby amplifying the sound produced by the strings. On all electric, acoustic and original guitars, the bridge holds the strings in place on the body. There are many varied bridge designs. There may be some mechanism for raising or lowering the bridge saddles to adjust the distance between the strings and the fretboard (action), or fine-tuning the intonation of the instrument. Some are spring-loaded and feature a "whammy bar", a removable arm that lets the player modulate the pitch by changing the tension on the strings. The whammy bar is sometimes also called a "tremolo bar". (The effect of rapidly changing pitch is properly called "vibrato". See Tremolo for further discussion of this term.) Some bridges also allow for alternate tunings at the touch of a button.

On almost all modern electric guitars, the bridge has saddles that are adjustable for each string so that intonation stays correct up and down the neck. If the open string is in tune, but sharp or flat when frets are pressed, the bridge saddle position can be adjusted with a screwdriver or hex key to remedy the problem. In general, flat notes are corrected by moving the saddle forward and sharp notes by moving it backward. On an instrument correctly adjusted for intonation, the actual length of each string from the nut to the bridge saddle is slightly, but measurably longer than the scale length of the instrument. This additional length is called compensation, which flattens all notes a bit to compensate for the sharping of all fretted notes caused by stretching the string during fretting.

===== Saddle =====
The saddle of a guitar is the part of the bridge that physically supports the strings. It may be one piece (typically on acoustic guitars) or separate pieces, one for each string (electric guitars and basses). The saddle's basic purpose is to provide the endpoint for the string's vibration at the correct location for proper intonation, and on acoustic guitars to transfer the vibrations through the bridge into the top wood of the guitar. Saddles are typically made of plastic or bone for acoustic guitars, though synthetics and some exotic animal tooth variations (e.g. fossilized tooth, ivory, etc. ) have become popular with some players. Electric guitar saddles are typically metal, though some synthetic saddles are available.

===== Pickguard =====
The pickguard, also known as the scratch plate, is usually a piece of laminated plastic or other material that protects the finish of the top of the guitar from damage due to the use of a plectrum ("pick") or fingernails. Electric guitars sometimes mount pickups and electronics on the pickguard. It is a common feature on steel-string acoustic guitars. Some performance styles that use the guitar as a percussion instrument (tapping the top or sides between notes, etc.), such as flamenco, require that a scratchplate or pickguard be fitted to nylon-string instruments.

==== Strings ====
The standard guitar has six strings, but four-, seven-, eight-, nine-, ten-, eleven-, twelve-, thirteen- and eighteen-string guitars are also available. Classical and flamenco guitars historically used gut strings, but these have been superseded by polymer materials, such as nylon and fluorocarbon. Modern guitar strings are constructed from metal, polymers, or animal or plant product materials. "Steel" strings may be made from alloys incorporating steel, nickel or phosphor bronze. Bass strings for both instruments are wound rather than monofilament.

==== Pickups and electronics ====
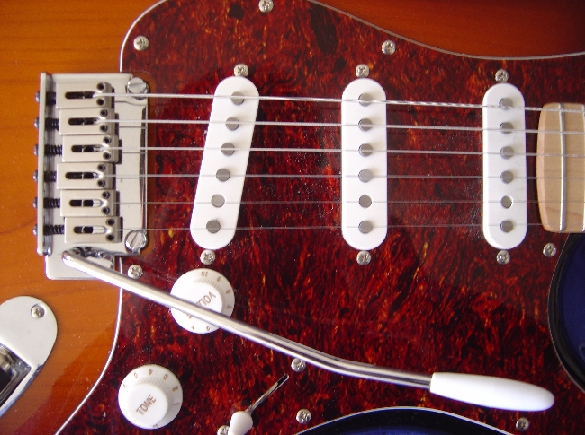
This Squier Stratocaster has features common to many electric guitars: multiple pickups, a vibrato bar/vibrato unit, and volume and tone knobs.

Pickups are transducers attached to a guitar that detect (or "pick up") string vibrations and convert the mechanical energy of the string into electrical energy. The resultant electrical signal can then be electronically amplified. The most common type of pickup is electromagnetic in design. These contain magnets that are within a coil, or coils, of copper wire. Such pickups are usually placed directly underneath the guitar strings. Electromagnetic pickups work on the same principles and in a similar manner to an electric generator. The vibration of the strings creates a small electric current in the coils surrounding the magnets. This signal current is carried to a guitar amplifier that drives a loudspeaker.

Traditional electromagnetic pickups are either single-coil or double-coil. Single-coil pickups are susceptible to noise induced by stray electromagnetic fields, usually mains-frequency (60 or 50 hertz) hum. The introduction of the double-coil humbucker in the mid-1950s solved this problem through the use of two coils, one of which is wired in opposite polarity to cancel or "buck" stray fields.

The types and models of pickups used can greatly affect the tone of the guitar. Typically, humbuckers, which are two magnet-coil assemblies attached to each other, are traditionally associated with a heavier sound. Single-coil pickups, one magnet wrapped in copper wire, are used by guitarists seeking a brighter, twangier sound with greater dynamic range.

Modern pickups are tailored to the sound desired. A commonly applied approximation used in the selection of a pickup is that less wire (lower electrical impedance) gives a brighter sound, more wire gives a "fat" tone. Other options include specialized switching that produces coil-splitting, in/out of phase and other effects. Guitar circuits are either active, needing a battery to power their circuit, or, as in most cases, equipped with a passive circuit.

Fender Stratocaster-type guitars generally have three single-coil pickups, while most Gibson Les Paul types have humbucker pickups.

Piezoelectric, or piezo, pickups represent another class of pickup. These employ piezoelectricity to generate the musical signal and are popular in hybrid electro-acoustic guitars. A crystal is located under each string, usually in the saddle. When the string vibrates, the shape of the crystal is distorted, and the stresses associated with this change produce tiny voltages across the crystal that can be amplified and manipulated. Piezo pickups usually require a powered pre-amplifier to lift their output to match that of electromagnetic pickups. Power is typically delivered by an on-board battery.

Most pickup-equipped guitars feature onboard controls, such as volume or tone, or pickup selection. At their simplest, these consist of passive components, such as potentiometers and capacitors, but may also include specialized integrated circuits or other active components requiring batteries for power, for preamplification and signal processing, or even for electronic tuning. In many cases, the electronics have some sort of shielding to prevent pickup of external interference and noise.

Guitars may be shipped or retrofitted with a hexaphonic pickup, which produces a separate output for each string, usually from a discrete piezoelectric or magnetic pickup. This arrangement lets on-board or external electronics process the strings individually for modeling or Musical Instrument Digital Interface (MIDI) conversion. Roland makes "GK" hexaphonic pickups for guitar and bass, and a line of guitar modeling and synthesis products. Line 6's hexaphonic-equipped Variax guitars use on-board electronics to model the sound after various vintage instruments, and vary pitch on individual strings.

MIDI converters use a hexaphonic guitar signal to determine pitch, duration, attack, and decay characteristics. The MIDI sends the note information to an internal or external sound bank device. The resulting sound closely mimics numerous instruments. The MIDI setup can also let the guitar be used as a game controller (i.e., Rock Band Squier) or as an instructional tool, as with the Fretlight Guitar.

== Tuning ==
=== Standard ===
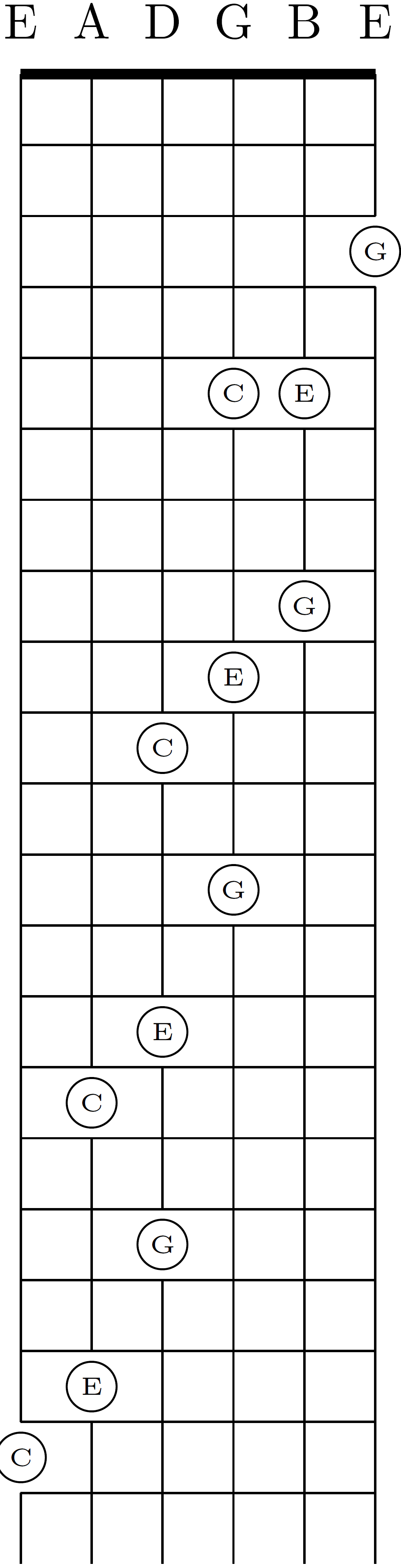
In standard tuning, the C-major chord has three shapes because of the irregular major-third between the G- and B-strings.

By the 16th century, the guitar tuning of ADGBE had already been adopted in Western culture; a lower E was later added on the bottom as a sixth string. The result, known as "standard tuning", has the strings tuned from a low E to a high E, traversing a two-octave range: EADGBE. This tuning is a series of ascending fourths (and a single major third) from low to high. The reason for ascending fourths is to accommodate four fingers on four frets up a scale before moving to the next string. This is musically convenient and physically comfortable, and it eased the transition between fingering chords and playing scales. If the tuning contained all perfect fourths, the range would be two octaves plus one semitone; the high string would be an F, a dissonant half-step from the low E and much out of place.

The pitches are as follows:

String	Scientific pitch	Helmholtz pitch	Interval from middle C	Frequency (Hz)
1st	E_{4}	e'	major third above	329.63
2nd	B_{3}	b	minor second below	246.94
3rd	G_{3}	g	perfect fourth below	196.00
4th	D_{3}	d	minor seventh below	146.83
5th	A_{2}	A	minor tenth below	110.00
6th	E_{2}	E	minor thirteenth below	82.41

The table below shows a pitch's name found over the six strings of a guitar in standard tuning, from the nut (zero), to the twelfth fret.

0	1	2	3	4	5	6	7	8	9	10	11	12
E	F	F♯	G	A♭	A	B♭	B	C	C♯	D	E♭	E
B	C	C♯	D	E♭	E	F	F♯	G	A♭	A	B♭	B
G	A♭	A	B♭	B	C	C♯	D	E♭	E	F	F♯	G
D	E♭	E	F	F♯	G	A♭	A	B♭	B	C	C♯	D
A	B♭	B	C	C♯	D	E♭	E	F	F♯	G	A♭	A
E	F	F♯	G	A♭	A	B♭	B	C	C♯	D	E♭	E

In the standard guitar-tuning, one major-third interval is interjected amid four perfect-fourth intervals. In each regular tuning, all string successions have the same interval.

For four strings, the 5th fret on one string is the same open-note as the next string; for example, a 5th-fret note on the sixth string is the same note as the open fifth string. However, between the second and third strings, an irregularity occurs: The 4th-fret note on the third string is equivalent to the open second string.

=== Alternative ===
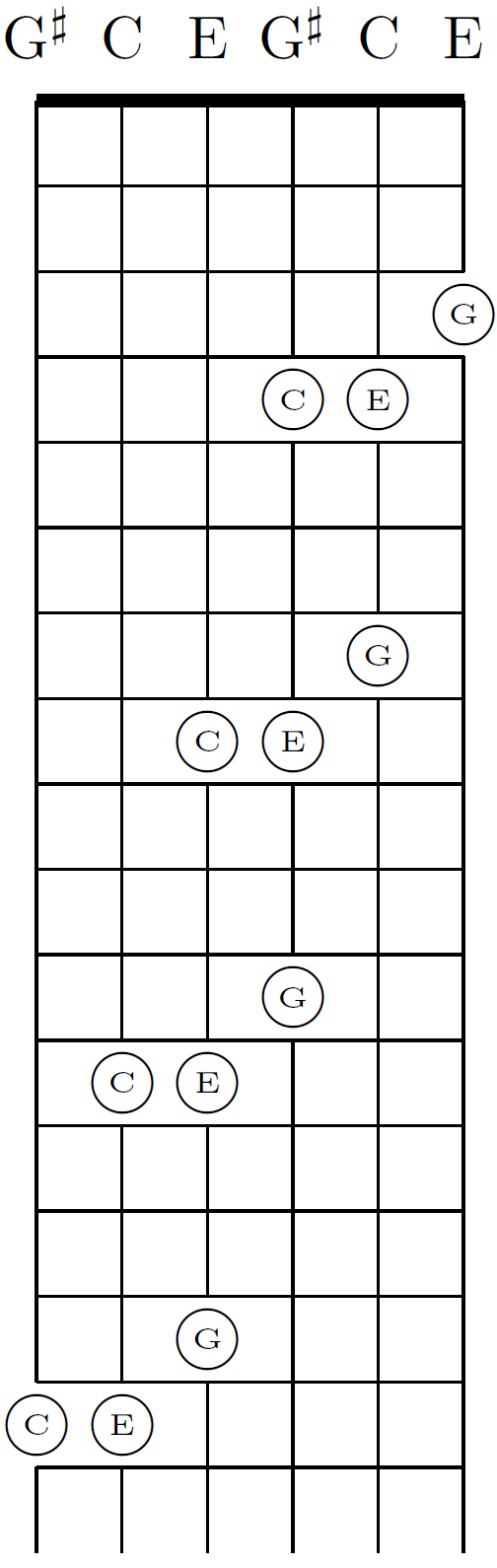
Chords can be shifted diagonally in major-thirds tuning and other regular tunings. In standard tuning, chords change their shape because of the irregular major-third G-B.

Standard tuning has evolved to provide a good compromise between simple fingering for many chords and the ability to play common scales with reasonable left-hand movement. There are also a variety of commonly used alternative tunings, for example, the classes of open, regular, and dropped tunings.

Open tuning refers to a guitar tuned so that strumming the open strings produces a chord, typically a major chord. The base chord consists of at least 3 notes and may include all the strings or a subset. The tuning is named for the open chord, Open D, open G, and open A are popular tunings. All similar chords in the chromatic scale can then be played by barring a single fret. Open tunings are common in blues music and folk music, and they are used in the playing of slide and bottleneck guitars. Many musicians use open tunings when playing slide guitar. Ry Cooder plays slide-guitar with open tunings.

For the standard tuning, there is exactly one interval of a major third between the second and third strings, and all the other intervals are fourths. The irregularity has a price – chords cannot be shifted around the fretboard in the standard tuning E-A-D-G-B-E, which requires four chord-shapes for the major chords. There are separate chord-forms for chords having their root note on the third, fourth, fifth, and sixth strings.

In contrast, regular tunings have equal intervals between the strings, and so they have symmetrical scales all along the fretboard. This makes it simpler to translate chords. For the regular tunings, chords may be moved diagonally around the fretboard. The diagonal movement of chords is especially simple for the regular tunings that are repetitive, in which case chords can be moved vertically: Chords can be moved three strings up (or down) in major-thirds tuning and chords can be moved two strings up (or down) in augmented-fourths tuning. Regular tunings thus appeal to new guitarists and also to jazz-guitarists, whose improvisation is simplified by regular intervals.

On the other hand, some chords are more difficult to play in a regular tuning than in standard tuning. It can be difficult to play conventional chords, especially in augmented-fourths tuning and all-fifths tuning, in which the large spacings require hand stretching. Some chords, which are conventional in folk music, are difficult to play even in all-fourths and major-thirds tunings, which do not require more hand-stretching than standard tuning.

- In major-thirds tuning, the interval between open strings is always a major third. Consequently, four frets suffice to play the chromatic scale. Chord inversion is especially simple in major-thirds tuning. Chords are inverted simply by raising one or two notes by three strings. The raised notes are played with the same finger as the original notes. In contrast, in standard tuning, the shape of inversions depends on the involvement of the irregular major-third.
- All-fourths tuning replaces the major third between the third and second strings with a fourth, extending the conventional tuning of a bass guitar. With all-fourths tuning, playing the triads is more difficult, but improvisation is simplified because chord-patterns remain constant when moved around the fretboard. Jazz guitarist Stanley Jordan uses the all-fourths tuning EADGCF. Invariant chord-shapes are an advantage of other regular tunings, such as major-thirds and all-fifths tunings.
- Extending the tunings of violins and cellos, all-fifths tuning offers an expanded range CGDAEB, which however has been impossible to implement on a conventional guitar. All-fifths tuning is used for the lowest five strings of the new standard tuning of Robert Fripp and his former students in Guitar Craft courses; new standard tuning has a high G on its last string CGDAE-G.

Another class of alternative tunings is called drop tunings, because the tuning drops down the lowest string. Dropping down the lowest string a whole tone results in the "drop-D" (or "dropped D") tuning. Its open-string notes DADGBE (from low to high) allow for a deep bass D note, which can be used in keys such as D major, d minor and G major. It simplifies the playing of simple fifths (powerchords). Many contemporary rock bands re-tune all strings down, making, for example, Drop-C or Drop-B tunings.

=== Scordatura ===
Many scordatura (alternate tunings) modify the standard tuning of the lute, especially when playing Renaissance music repertoire originally written for that instrument. Some scordatura drop the pitch of one or more strings, giving access to new lower notes. Some scordatura makes it easier to play in unusual keys.

== Accessories ==
Though a guitar may be played on its own, there are a variety of common accessories used for holding and playing the guitar.

=== Capotasto ===
A capo (short for capotasto) is used to change the pitch of open strings. Capos are clipped onto the fretboard with the aid of spring tension or, in some models, elastic tension. To raise the guitar's pitch by one semitone, the player would clip the capo onto the fretboard just below the first fret. Its use allows players to play in different keys without having to change the chord formations they use. For example, if a folk guitar player wanted to play a song in the key of B Major, they could put a capo on the second fret of the instrument, and then play the song as if it were in the key of A Major, but with the capo the instrument would make the sounds of B Major. This is because, with the capo barring the entire second fret, open chords would all sound two semitones (in other words, one tone) higher in pitch. For example, if a guitarist played an open A Major chord (a very common open chord), it would sound like a B Major chord. All of the other open chords would be similarly modified in pitch. Because of the ease with which they allow guitar players to change keys, they are sometimes referred to with pejorative names, such as "cheaters" or the "hillbilly crutch". Despite this negative viewpoint, another benefit of the capo is that it enables guitarists to obtain the ringing, resonant sound of the common keys (C, G, A, etc.) in "harder" and less-commonly used keys. Classical performers are known to use them to enable modern instruments to match the pitch of historical instruments such as the Renaissance music lute.

=== Slides ===
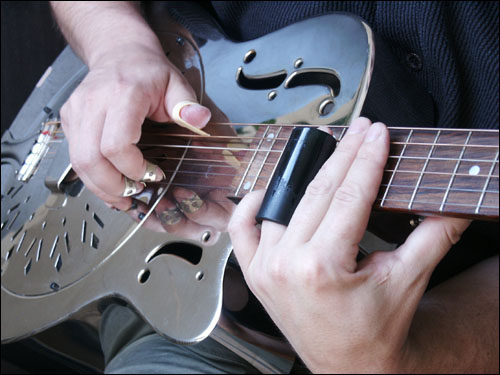
Example of a bottleneck slide, with fingerpicks and a resonator guitar made of metal

A slide or a steel is a hard smooth object (a steel bar, round metal or glass bar or cylinder, neck of a bottle) commonly used in country music or blues music, to create a glissando effect made popular in Hawaiian music at the beginning of the 20th century. The slide is pressed against the strings by the non-dominant hand, instead of using player's fingers on frets; the strings are then plucked by the dominant hand. The characteristic use of the slide is to move up to the intended pitch by, as the name implies, sliding up the neck to the desired note. Historically, necks of bottles were often used in blues and country music as improvised slides, giving the name "bottleneck guitar" to a style of blues music. Modern slides are constructed of glass, plastic, ceramic, chrome, brass or steel bars or cylinders, depending on the weight and tone desired. An instrument that is played exclusively in this manner (using a metal bar) is called a steel guitar or pedal steel. In such case, the hard object is called a "steel" instead of a slide, and is the reason for the name "steel guitar". A resonator guitar is a steel guitar built with a metal cone under the strings to make the instrument louder.

=== Plectrum ===
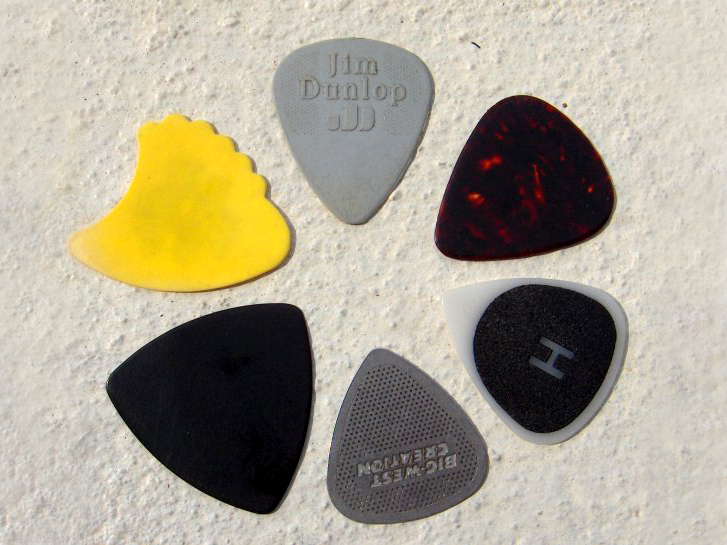
A variety of guitar picks

A "guitar pick" or "plectrum" is a small piece of hard material generally held between the thumb and first finger of the picking hand and is used to "pick" the strings. Though most classical players pick with a combination of fingernails and fleshy fingertips, the pick is most often used for electric and steel-string acoustic guitars. Though today they are mainly plastic, variations do exist, such as bone, wood, steel or tortoise shell. Tortoise shell was the most commonly used material in the early days of pick-making, but as tortoises and turtles became endangered, the practice of using their shells for picks or anything else was banned. Tortoise-shell picks made before the ban are often coveted for a supposedly superior tone and ease of use, and their scarcity has made them valuable.

Picks come in many shapes and sizes. Picks vary from the small jazz pick to the large bass pick. The thickness of the pick often determines its use. A thinner pick (between 0.2 and 0.5 mm) is usually used for strumming or rhythm playing, whereas thicker picks (between 0.7 and 1.5+ mm) are usually used for single-note lines or lead playing. The distinctive guitar sound of Billy Gibbons is attributed to using a quarter or peso as a pick. Similarly, Brian May is known to use a sixpence coin as a pick, while noted 1970s and early 1980s session musician David Persons is known for using old credit cards, cut to the correct size, as plectrums.

Thumb picks and finger picks that attach to the fingertips are sometimes employed in finger-picking styles on steel strings. These allow the fingers and thumb to operate independently, whereas a flat pick requires the thumb and one or two fingers to manipulate.

=== Straps ===
A guitar strap is a strip of material with an attachment mechanism on each end, made to hold a guitar via the shoulders at an adjustable length. Guitars have varying accommodations for attaching a strap. The most common are strap buttons, also called strap pins, which are flanged steel posts anchored to the guitar with screws. Two strap buttons come pre-attached to virtually all electric guitars, and many steel-string acoustic guitars. Strap buttons are sometimes replaced with "strap locks", which connect the guitar to the strap more securely.

The lower strap button is usually located at the bottom (bridge end) of the body. The upper strap button is usually located near or at the top (neck end) of the body: on the upper body curve, at the tip of the upper "horn" (on a double cutaway), or at the neck joint (heel). Some electrics, especially those with odd-shaped bodies, have one or both strap buttons on the back of the body. Some Steinberger electric guitars, owing to their minimalist and lightweight design, have both strap buttons at the bottom of the body. Rarely, on some acoustics, the upper strap button is located on the headstock. Some acoustic and classical guitars only have a single strap button at the bottom of the body—the other end must be tied onto the headstock, above the nut and below the machine heads.

=== Amplifiers, effects and speakers ===
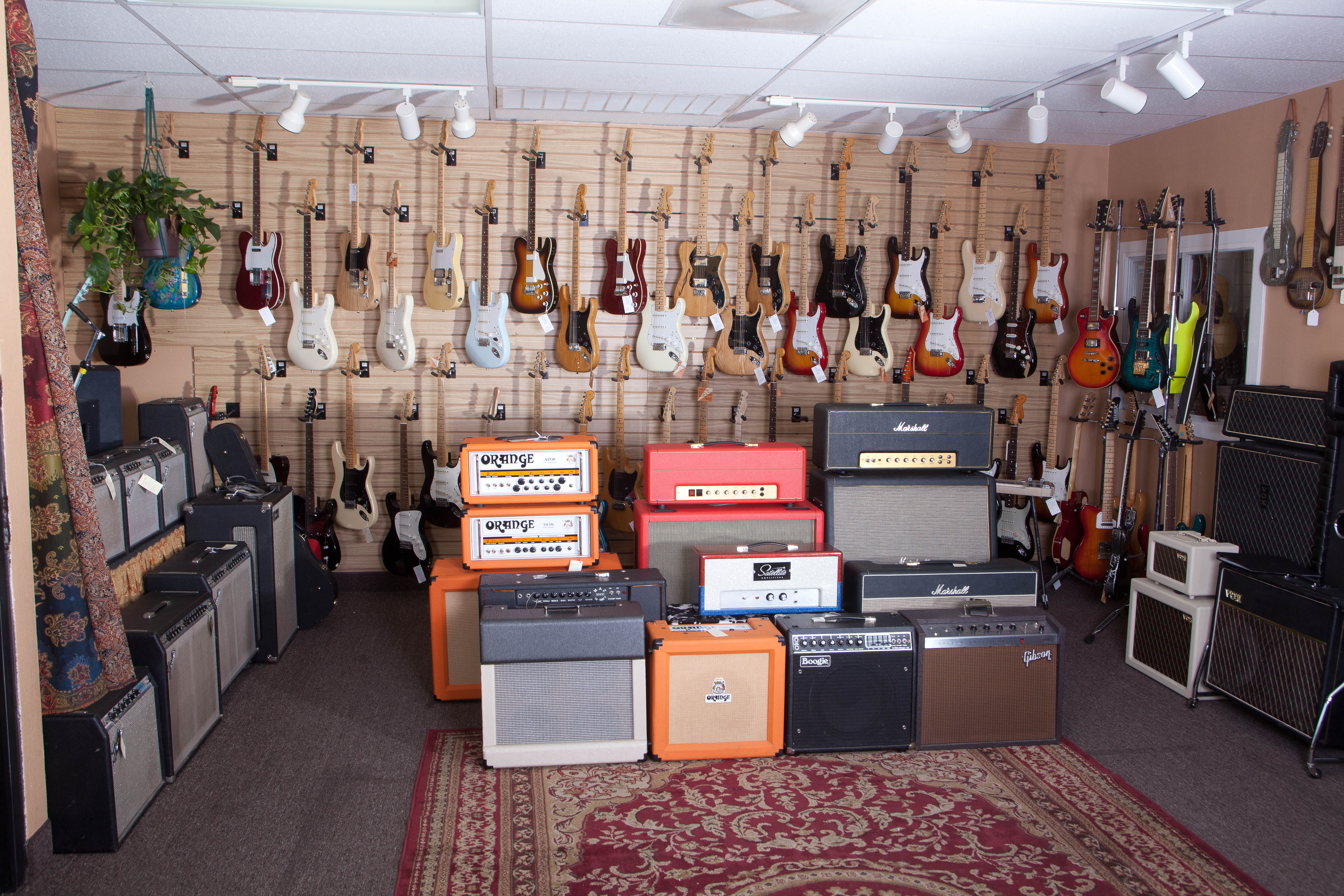
A range of guitar amplifiers and guitars for sale at a music store

Electric guitars and bass guitars have to be used with a guitar amplifier and loudspeaker or a bass amplifier and speaker, respectively, in order to make enough sound to be heard by the performer and audience. Electric guitars and bass guitars almost always use magnetic pickups, which generate an electric signal when the musician plucks, strums or otherwise plays the instrument. The amplifier and speaker strengthen this signal using a power amplifier and a loudspeaker. Acoustic guitars that are equipped with a piezoelectric pickup or microphone can also be plugged into an instrument amplifier, acoustic guitar amp or PA system to make them louder. With electric guitar and bass, the amplifier and speaker are not just used to make the instrument louder; by adjusting the equalizer controls, the preamplifier, and any onboard effects units (reverb, distortion/overdrive, etc.) the player can also modify the tone (also called the timbre or "colour") and sound of the instrument. Acoustic guitar players can also use the amp to change the sound of their instrument, but in general, acoustic guitar amps are used to make the natural acoustic sound of the instrument louder without significantly changing its sound.

== See also ==
- List of guitar manufacturers
- Outline of guitars
- Paracho de Verduzco

== Notes and references ==
=== Sources ===
==== Books, journals ====
- Bacon, Tony (1997). The Ultimate Guitar Book. Alfred A. Knopf. ISBN 0-375-70090-0.
- Bacon, Tony (2012). History of the American Guitar: 1833 to the Present Day. Backbeat. ISBN 978-1-61713-033-5.
- Bone, P J. (1954). The Guitar and Mandolin: Biographies of Celebrated Players and Composers (2nd ed.). London: Schott.
- Denyer, Ralph (1992). The Guitar Handbook. Special contributors Isaac Guillory and Alastair M. Crawford. London and Sydney: Pan Books. ISBN 0-679-74275-1.
- Farmer, Henry George (1930). Historical Facts for the Arabian Musical Influence. Ayer. ISBN 0-405-08496-X.
- French, Richard Mark (2012). Technology of the Guitar. Robert Fripp (foreword). New York; Heidelberg: Springer Verlag. ISBN 978-1-4614-1920-4.
- Gioia, Joe (2013). The Guitar and the New World: A Fugitive History. State University of New York Press. ISBN 978-1-4384-4617-2.
- Kasha, Michael (August 1968). "A New Look at The History of the Classic Guitar". Guitar Review. 30.
- Strong, James (1890). The Exhaustive Concordance of the Bible. Cincinnati: Jennings & Graham.
- Summerfield, Maurice J. (2003). The Classical Guitar: Its Evolution, Players and Personalities Since 1800 (5th ed.). Blaydon on Tyne: Ashley Mark. ISBN 1-872639-46-1.
- Wade, Graham (2001). A Concise History of the Classic Guitar. Mel Bay. ISBN 0-7866-4978-X.

==== Online ====
- Sethares, William A. (2001). "Alternate Tuning Guide" (PDF). University of Wisconsin.
- Turnbull, Harvey; et al. "Guitar". Oxford Music Online. Oxford University Press.
