= Höfner 500/1 =

Famed electric bass model

Höfner 500/1 Violin Bass
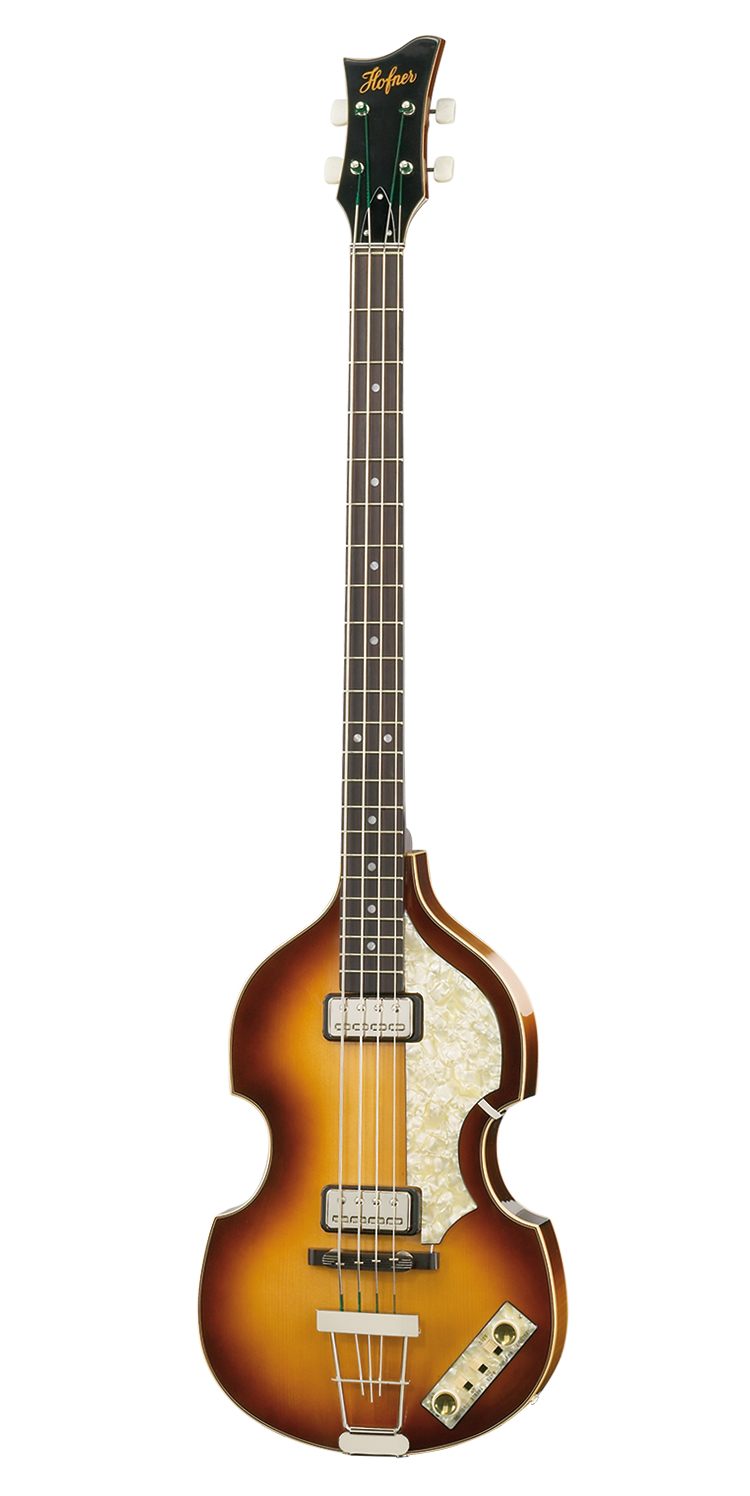
- The Höfner 500/1 '62 "Mersey" model (reissue)
- Manufacturer: Karl Höfner GmbH & Co.
- Period: 1955–Present

Construction
- Body type: Hollow (Note: The Contemporary series models contain a centre block.)
- Scale: 30 in (760 mm)

Woods
- Body: Spruce (top), maple (back/sides)
- Neck: Maple
- Fretboard: Rosewood

Hardware
- Bridge: Höfner Ebony Bridge
- Pickup: Höfner 511B Humbucking Pickups

Colors available
- Sunburst, black, laurel, rosewood and many others

The Höfner 500/1 Violin Bass (sometimes nicknamed the "Beatle Bass") is a model of electric bass manufactured by Höfner under several varieties. It was introduced in 1955 and gained fame during the 1960s as the primary bass used by Paul McCartney of the Beatles.

== History ==
In 1955, Walter Höfner designed an electrically amplified semi-acoustic bass. The hollow body made this style of bass very light and easy to play, as well as giving it a rich tone similar to that of the traditional double bass. The bass was first shown to the public at the Frankfurt Music Fair in early 1956.

Following the popularity of the Violin Bass created by its use by Paul McCartney, Höfner began producing a similar alternative in terms of sound and size with a different shaped body, the Höfner 500/2 Club Bass, in 1964.

== Description ==
The Höfner 500/1 is a hollow-body instrument, though lacking soundholes, and is as such commonly referred to as a semi-hollow bass. It is built using a fairly traditional style, similar to that of an acoustic guitar. It commonly features a thin maple body, a spruce top and a maple neck. The fretboard is traditionally made of rosewood, though more contemporary models have utilized other, similar tonewoods. The Höfner 500/ features a two-piece bridge system, consisting of an adjustable ebony bridge, and a metal tailpiece. The Höfner 500 is also notable for its distinctive control layout, featuring two rotary knobs, as well as three sliding knobs, controlling tone and pickup selection.

Prior to 1962, the two pickups were mounted near each other up against the heel of the neck, and as a result they had very similar tone, even when played separately. In 1962, the bass was slightly redesigned to move the second pickup up against the bridge, giving each a more distinct tone. Additional cosmetic changes were made to the bass in 1962, including the use of a different logo on the headstock and different tuning pegs. Otherwise, the instrument in both configurations featured the same "brunette" sunburst finish, the same pearloid pickguard, and the same electronics and control configuration. The earlier version is often referred to as the "Cavern bass", after the Cavern Club, where Paul McCartney famously made use of this particular model. More modern re-issues have been made in both configurations.

== Use by Paul McCartney ==
In July 1961, before Stuart Sutcliffe decided to leave the Beatles, he briefly lent Paul McCartney his bass until McCartney could afford one of his own. McCartney was drawn to the Höfner because he felt that its symmetrical shape would mean that playing it left-handed would not look as awkward as using a cutaway guitar designed for a right-handed player. As Höfner did not sell a left-handed version of the 500/1 at the time, McCartney's was a custom-built model. He placed the order for the bass at the Steinway Musikhaus in Hamburg, then the largest and most prestigious music store in the city. McCartney recalls ordering the bass as it was "quite cheap" in comparison to other instruments. It is likely this was the first left-handed 500/1 bass Hofner made.

"I remember going along there, and there was this bass which was quite cheap. I couldn't afford a Fender. Fenders even then seemed to be about £100. All I could really afford was about £30 ... so for about £30, I found this Hofner violin bass. And to me, it seemed like, because I was left-handed, it looked less daft because it was symmetrical. Didn't look as bad as a cutaway which was the wrong way. So I got into that."

McCartney eventually acquired two basses of this model: his original 1961 model with stacked pickups, and a 1963 model with the widely separated pickups. By early 1964, McCartney began using the newer bass almost exclusively, leaving the original as a backup. In 1964, he had his 1961 model repaired because it was tattered by use. To McCartney's horror it came back painted a very red sunburst. Also a new wooden pickup holder was installed around the original pickups, as the original plastic surround nearer the neck had snapped. He can be seen using this bass in the "Revolution" promo video with the strap attached to the headstock instead of the neck heel, presumably to counteract the instrument's neck dive, which is caused by its light body. He continued to regularly use the violin bass until 1965 when he switched to a Rickenbacker 4001S; afterwards, he would rotate between the two. On 30 January 1969 the Höfner Bass made its last Beatle appearance at the Apple Corps rooftop concert. McCartney switched to using his 1963 model for the remainder of the album. He switched back to the Rickenbacker for the recording of Abbey Road and continued to use it with Wings and his solo career. The 1961 bass was stolen from a van in 1972, and was not recovered until 2024.

In 1988, while recording the Flowers in the Dirt album, a collaboration with Elvis Costello led to a request from Costello for McCartney to bring the 500/1 back from retirement. As of 2024, he is still in possession of the 1963 bass, and regularly uses it for performances.

In September 2023, Nick Wass, a Liverpool native and former Höfner marketing manager and guitar developer, launched the "Lost Bass Project" to recover McCartney's stolen Höfner bass. In February 2024, it was revealed that the bass had finally been recovered. The Lost Bass Project traced it to the south coast of England when someone who unknowingly possessed the bass in their attic contacted the organization for its recovery. The bass was played onstage for the first time in decades on 19 December 2024, at the end of McCartney's Got Back tour at The O2 Arena in London. The story of the search for the bass is told in the 2026 documentary McCartney: The Hunt for the Lost Bass.

== Images ==
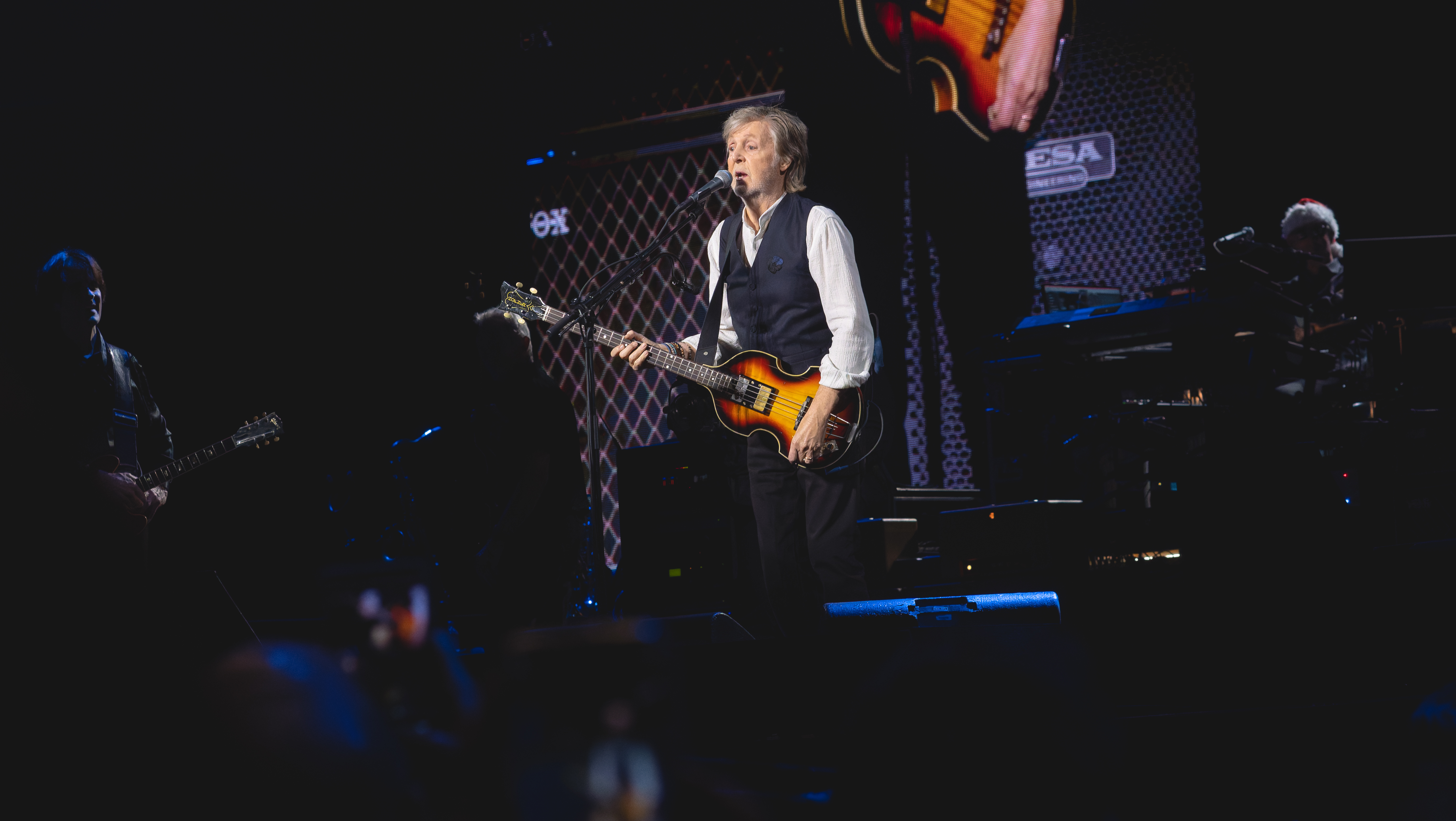
Paul McCartney with his first (1961) Höfner bass in 2024.

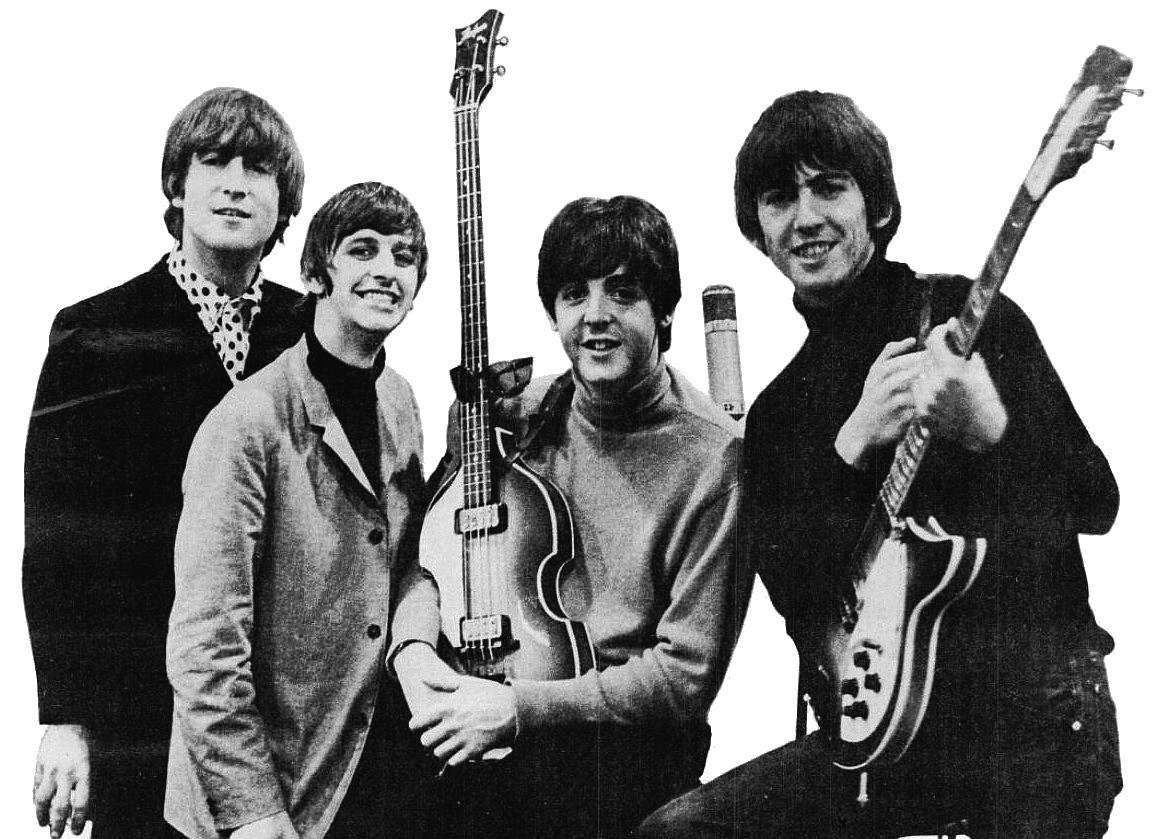
Paul McCartney (second from the right) with his second (1963) Höfner bass in 1965.

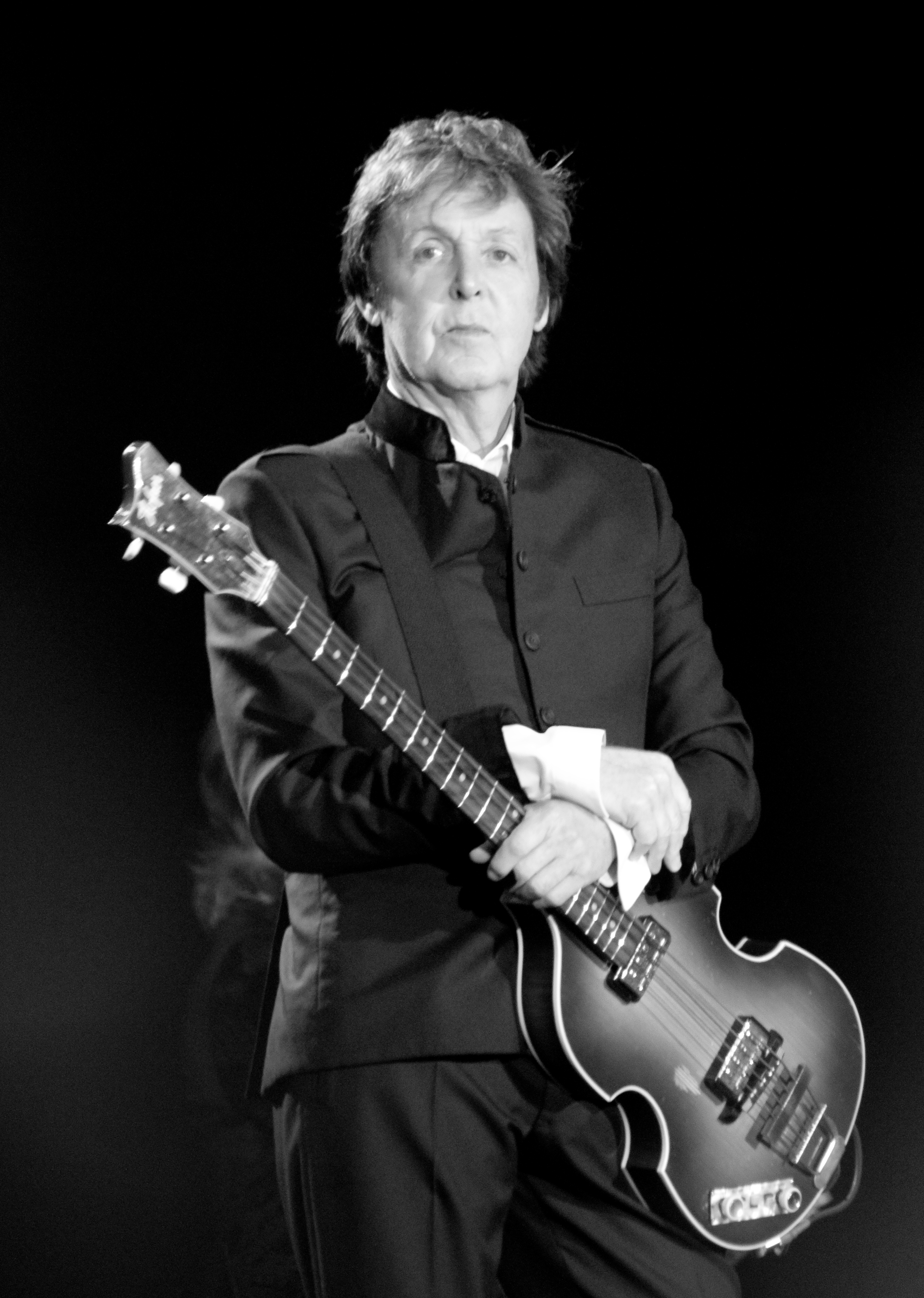
Paul McCartney with his second (1963) Höfner bass in 2010. He removed the pickguard during The Beatles' 1966 US tour. (Note: To be more precise, it was removed in between the concerts at the DC Stadium in Washington D.C. on August 15, 1966 and the one at the John F. Kennedy Stadium in Philadelphia on the following day.)

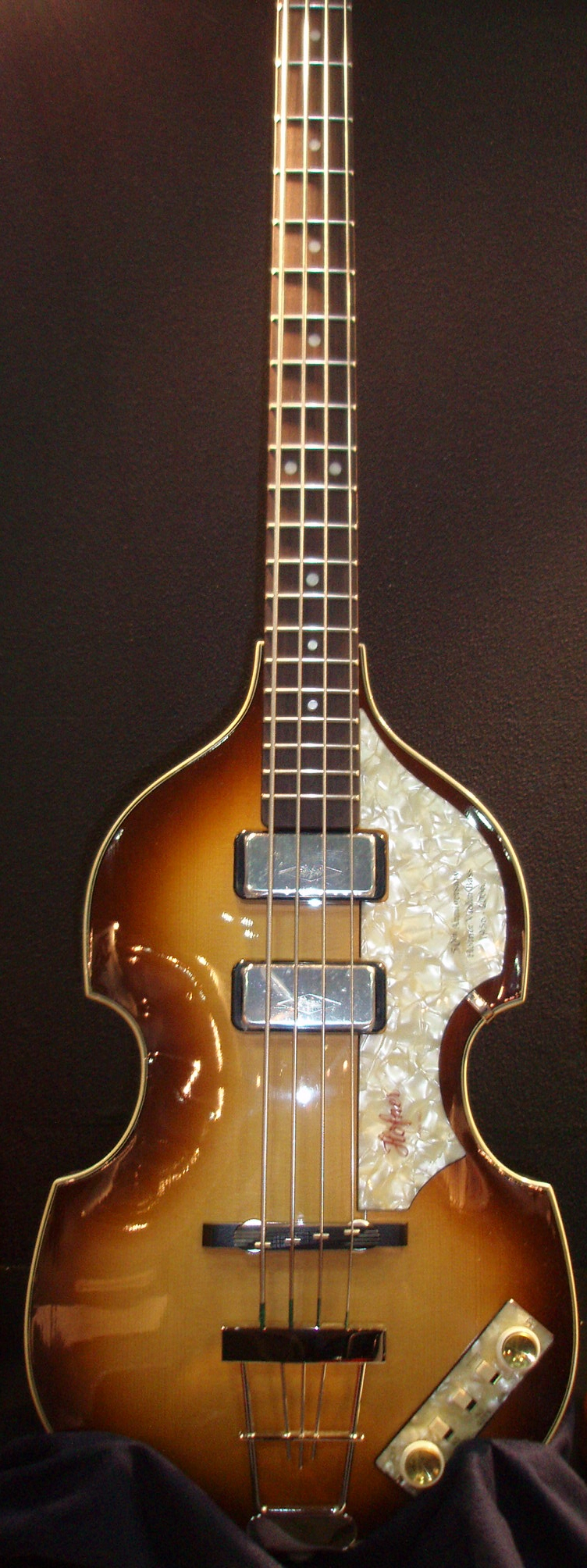
Höfner 500/1 50th Anniversary RH (reissue)
In their original run, the 500/1 used this stacked pickup configuration prior to 1962.

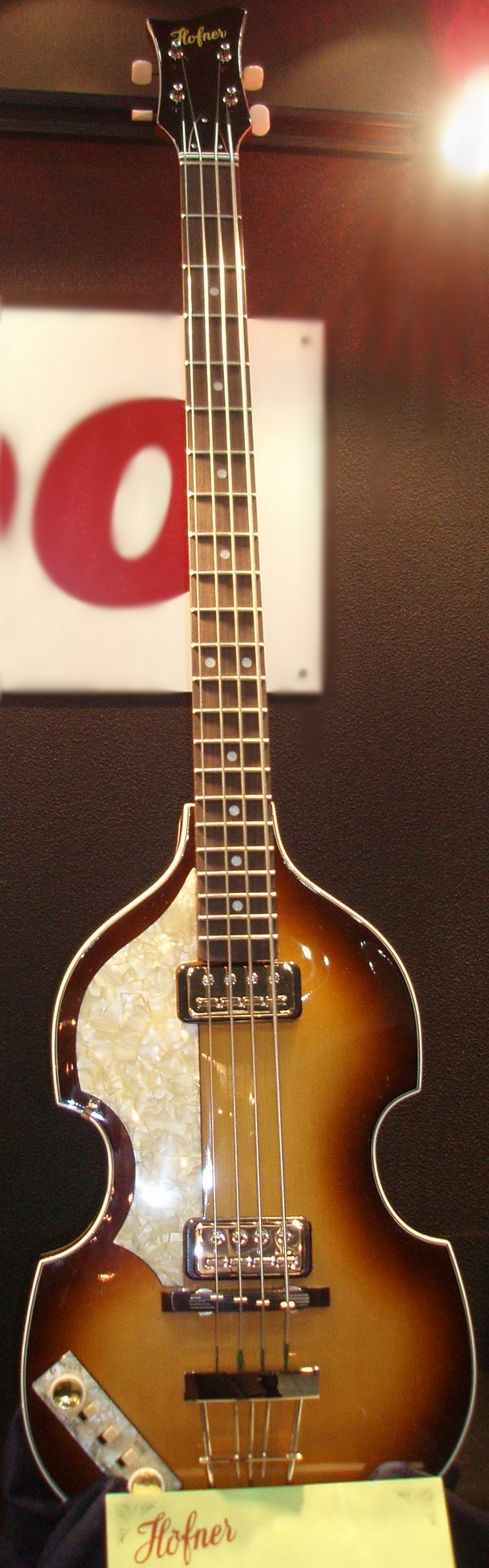
Vintage 1962 model 500/1 V '62 (left-handed)

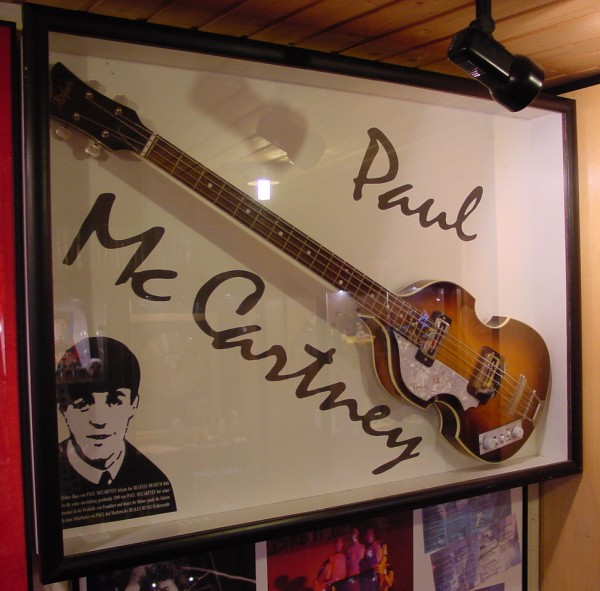
A Höfner bass on display at the Beatles-Museum Biebelnheim

== Variations ==
The following variations are or were sold by Höfner:

- 500/1 Vintage '58 re-issue
- 500/1 Vintage '59 re-issue
- 500/1 Cavern Bass (no longer available from Höfner)
- 500/1 Vintage '61 Cavern Bass (2011 model - based on Paul McCartney's original specs) [as of 2024, known as the "'Vintage' '61"]
  - as of 2024, a vintage-style and -color model is also made based on Paul McCartney's '63 500/1
- 500/1 Vintage '62 "Mersey" [as of 2024, known as the "'Mersey' '62"]
- 500/1 Vintage '62 50th Anniversary Edition (2014) of "The Ed Sullivan Show". Limited Edition of 64 only.
- 500/1 Vintage '63 (no longer in production)
- 500/1 Vintage '64 (replaced '63)
- 500/1 125th Anniversary 'Black Violin Bass'
- 5000/1 Deluxe Bass (no longer in production)
- 500/1 KV 60th Anniversary model with graphics designed by Klaus Voormann
  - as of 2024, renamed the "Violin Bass '63 - 60th Anniversary Edition II"
- H500/1-CT Contemporary Series ("Designed in Germany" printed on back of head. "Made in China" on sticker on back of head.)
- Icon series B-Bass, made in China (name changed to Ignition for legal reasons in 2010)
  - Höfner produced limited runs of the Icon B Bass in 5 custom color schemes. Only 150 of each color were manufactured and made available for sale in 2008.
  - In 2008, the Icon B Bass was also issued in a limited edition "Dark Burst" finish, of which 88 were produced.
- HI series B-Bass (Ignition), made in Indonesia, from 2010. A cheaper budget option.
  - As of 2024, it is available in various colors and versions, including the Cavern version (based on Paul McCartney's '61 Hofner 500/1) and one version in two colors (sunburst and black; based on McCartney's '63 Hofner 500/1)
- Violin Bass CT
- Violin Bass Artist (available in sunburst and black; based on McCartney's '63 Hofner 500/1)
- Violin Bass - Green Line
- Violin Bass Cavern '61
- Violin Bass '62
- Violin Bass Rooftop '69 (based on the condition of McCartney's '63 Hofner 500/1 at The Beatles' rooftop concert in 1969)

== Imitators ==
Due to the cost of the official Höfner bass, several guitar companies offer more affordable versions of the "violin bass". These include Greco, Epiphone, Tokai, El Dégas, Jay Turser, Duesenberg, Rogue, Douglas, Harley Benton and Eko. Carl Wilson and Al Jardine of The Beach Boys occasionally played a Höfner imitation bass during the late 1960s, most notably at the 1967 concerts in Honolulu, Hawaii, that produced the long-unreleased live album Lei'd in Hawaii.

== Höfner 500/1 players ==
- Paul McCartney
- Satomi Matsuzaki of Deerhoof
- Angel Deradoorian
- Murray Cook of the Wiggles
- Kevin Parker of Tame Impala frequently uses a Höfner to create his songs.
- Tom Hamilton of Aerosmith played a Höfner on the recording sessions for Just Push Play, and on the recording of "What It Takes".
- Robbie Shakespeare
- Chris Wood of Medeski Martin and Wood and the Wood Brothers
- Yen Chih-Lin of Power Station
- Zach Dawes of the Last Shadow Puppets
- Charly Garcia in Random
- Doug Fieger of the Knack and Sky owned a Höfner.
- Göran Lagerberg of Tages
- Jon Anderson on Olias of Sunhillow
- Awan Garnida of Sore Ze Band
- Tony Jackson of the Searchers
- Jim Fielder played a 500/1 whilst a member of Buffalo Springfield

== In popular culture ==
The Höfner 500/1 appeared in Guitar Hero II. A replica of the Höfner bass used by McCartney (albeit right-handed) is used as the basis for a guitar controller included with the special edition bundle of the video game The Beatles: Rock Band.

== See also ==
- List of the Beatles' instruments
