= History of the classical guitar =

The evolution of classical guitars began with the influences of the gittern and vihuela in the 16th century and ended with the modern classical guitar in the mid-19th century.

== Renaissance stringed instruments ==
While the precise lineage of the instrument is still unclear, historians believe that the guitar is the descendant of the Greek kithara, gittern, lyre, European and Middle Eastern lutes, and the Spanish vihuela. The poem The Book of Good Love [circa 1330] describes two early instruments, guitarra morisca and guitarra latina.

Then came out, with a strident sound, the two-stringed Moor’s gittern,
High-pitched as to its range, as to its tone both harsh and bold;
Big-bellied lute which marks the time for merry, rustic dance,
And Spanish guitar which with the rest was herded in the fold

Instruments called "guitars" were first mentioned in literature in the 13th century, though many of these medieval records describe instruments that in modern times are classified as gitterns. The first incarnation of what is now called the guitar first appeared during the Renaissance. The Renaissance guitar contained four pairs of strings called courses. The Renaissance guitar shared most similarities with the Spanish vihuela, a six-coursed instrument with similar tuning and construction. Juan Bermudo in 1555 published Declaración de Instrumentos Musicales, a treatise containing a section on plucked string instruments. This publication examined the relationship between the guitar and vihuela, and also differentiated between four- and five-course guitars. The five-course guitar did not phase out the four-course instrument until the Baroque period.

One of the first major methods published for five-course guitar is Joan Carles Amat's Guitarra Española y Vandola en Dos Maneras de Guitarra, Castellana y Cathalana de Cinco Ordenes, published in 1596.

The vihuela became popular in Spain and Italy and remained common until the late 16th century. This instrument appears to have had a strong influence in the design and tuning of the early five-course guitars that first appeared in Spain in the middle of the 16th century. These five-course guitarras replaced the four-course Renaissance instruments, particularly in Spain. The guitarra set the modern standard tuning – A, D, G, B, E – for the top five strings that continues to this day. The number of frets on the guitar was increased from eight to ten and eventually to twelve. Later, it was in Italy that a sixth course became commonplace and this was an easily done by replacing or reworking the nut and bridge to plug in another tuning peg hole for the sixth string. An ornate guitar made by a Joakim Thielke (1641–1719) of Germany was altered in this way and became a success.

From the mid-18th century through the early 19th century, the guitar evolved into a six-string instrument, phasing out courses by preference to single strings. These six-string guitars were still smaller than the modern classical guitar.

== Modern classical guitar ==
The design of the modern classical guitar can be attributed to Antonio de Torres. The construction of these guitars has been considered the standard in "traditional" instruments since the mid-19th century.

Contemporary classical guitars follow the Smallman design which replaces the fan braces with a much lighter balsa brace attached to the back of the sound board with carbon fiber. The balsa brace has a honeycomb pattern and allows the (now much thinner) sound board to support more vibrational modes. This leads to greater volume and longer sustain.

== Bibliography ==
- Wade, Graham, Traditions of the Classical bris, London : Calder, 1980.
- Antoni Pizà: Francesc Guerau i el seu temps (Palma de Mallorca: Govern de les Illes Balears, Conselleria d'Educació i Cultura, Direcció General de Cultura, Institut d'Estudis Baleàrics, 2000)
