= Jay Turser =

American stringed instrument manufacturer

Jay Turser Guitars
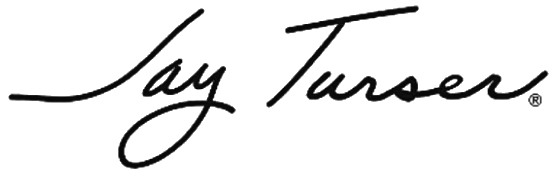
- Company type: Subsidiary
- Industry: Musical instruments
- Headquarters: United States
- Products: Electric and acoustic guitars
- Parent: Davitt & Hanser
- Website: jayturser.com

Jay Turser Guitars is an American musical instruments manufacturer, currently a brand of Davitt & Hanser, a division of JAM Industries. Since its inception, Jay Turser has been producing electric and acoustic guitars.

In 2008, Jay Turser signed a deal with Graph Tech Guitar Labs (the world's leading guitar nut and saddle maker by then) to incorporate its technology to instruments manufactured. Graph Tech was also supplier for several guitar companies such as Taylor, Martin, Larrivée, Ovation, Carvin, Fender, Fernandes, Godin, Ibanez, Samick, Schecter, Gibson, Tacoma and Yamaha.

Jay Turser was a subsidiary of the U.S. Music Corporation (located in Buffalo Grove, Illinois) until it was acquired by Canadian corporate group Jam Industries in 2009.

== Products ==
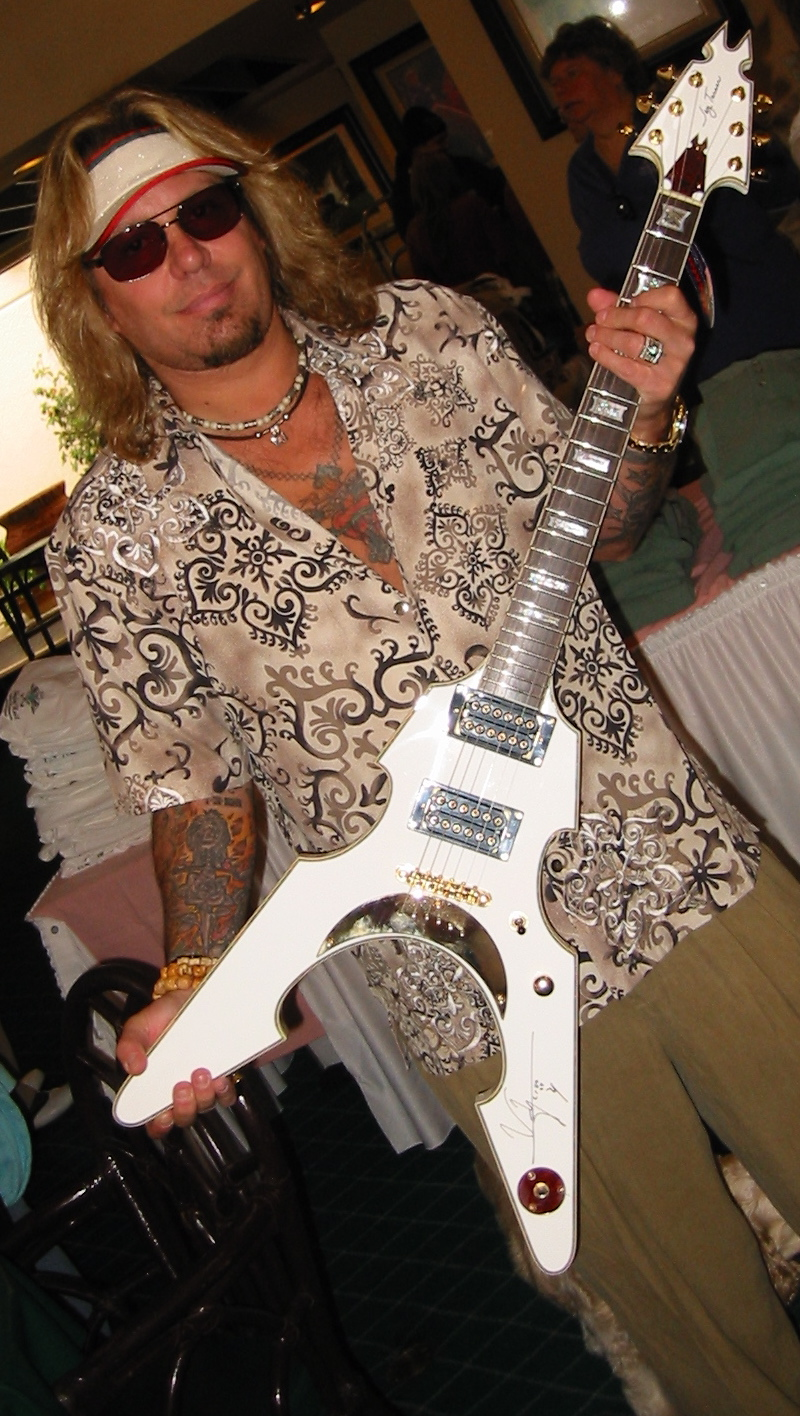
Mötley Crüe's Vince Neil with a Jay Turser Warlord guitar

Jay Turser produces guitars, basses, mandolins and banjos in a variety of models.

Production facilities are located in China and rely primarily on Asian suppliers for parts and electronics but use imported woods, such as mahogany, maple and rosewood, for the body and neck. The products are sold worldwide.

The company produces both electric and acoustic guitars. They also produce a line of acoustic and electric guitars targeted toward entry level musicians, sold in kits that come with accessories and instructional DVDs.

== Awards ==
In 2004 Jay Turser received Guitar Player Magazine's Reader's Choice Award for Ultimate Value for the JT-200 line and the December 2011 Editor's Pick for the JT-LT-RW model.
