= McCartney: The Hunt for the Lost Bass =

2026 documentary film

- Release poster
- Directed by: Arthur Cary
- Story by: Scott and Naomi Jones
- Produced by: Katherine Anstey; Emily Jeal; Hamish Fergusson
- Starring: Paul McCartney; Mike McCartney; Klaus Voormann
- Cinematography: Johann Perry
- Edited by: Paul Carlin
- Music by: Tim Atack
- Production companies: BBC; Fremantle; Passion Pictures; Footprint; Dartmouth Films
- Release date: 2 April 2026
- Running time: 87 minutes
- Country: United Kingdom
- Language: English

McCartney: The Hunt for the Lost Bass is a 2026 British documentary film directed by Arthur Cary. It is a Passion Pictures production in association with The Footprint Partnership. Klaus Voormann provided original artwork for the film. The story was originated by Scott and Naomi Jones, the founders of Footprint and The Lost Bass Project. Nick Wass, the world's number one expert on the Hofner 500/1 Violin Bass, and the third member of The Lost Bass Project, was a consultant.

== Synopsis ==
Using interviews, archive material and dramatic reconstructions, the film tells the story of the search for Paul McCartney’s lost Höfner 500/1 violin bass guitar. Bought by McCartney in Hamburg in 1961, and used extensively with The Beatles, the instrument was stolen in London in 1972 and remained missing for over 50 years.

== Cast ==
Interviewees (alphabetical):

- Elvis Costello
- Andy Dickinson
- Steve Glenister
- Elaine Guest
- Ian Horne
- Naomi Jones
- Scott Jones
- Mike McCartney
- Paul McCartney
- Klaus Voormann
- Nick Wass

== Release ==
The film was released in UK cinemas for a limited run on 2 and 4 April 2026, and aired on Saturday 11 April 2026 on BBC Two and iPlayer.

== Reception ==
In The Daily Telegraph Ed Power gave the film 4/5 stars and wrote: "As a film about a missing guitar – even one estimated to be worth more than £10 million – some might find the 90-minute duration off-putting. But as a profile of McCartney and what this unique instrument contributed to his style of playing and, especially the Beatles’ legacy, it’s worth every minute."

In The Guardian, Peter Bradshaw gave the film 3/5 stars, writing: "It is an amiable tale with a happy ending but, oddly, the film can’t quite absorb the sadness, and even shame, that are disclosed in the denouement. ... As for McCartney, he forgivingly says that nicking things almost for a lark is the sort of thing that he and his mates might have done themselves, back in the day. It’s a diverting footnote."

Film critic Mark Kermode featured the film on his podcast and said “the documentary that is charmingly made gets the mix of mystery and melancholia just right. I really enjoyed watching this. If you’ve ever cradled a guitar, if you’ve ever held a guitar it’s a very physical thing, particularly a bass... McCartney says 'it’s out there somewhere in the universe and it wants to come back', and so when it does it’s really moving and sweet.”

In The Daily Mail, Kathryn Flett gave 4/5 stars, writing: "This charming 90-minute film, directed by BAFTA-winner Arthur Cary, takes a fashionably forensic approach to crime-solving, with numerous twists, turns and talking heads. However, the cold-case story that unfolds is less Silent Witness, more Dixon of Dock Green – with an unexpectedly poignant final twist".

In The Times Kavin Maher gave 2/5 stars, writing: "The film’s director, Arthur Cary, admittedly crafts some sensitive character profiling among the enthusiastic bass hunters. But elsewhere and especially by the bathetic conclusion, it’s difficult not to regard the entire project with a vaguely benign shoulder shrug."

The Sunday Telegraph called it "a charming documentary."
