= Guitarra morisca =

Type of lute

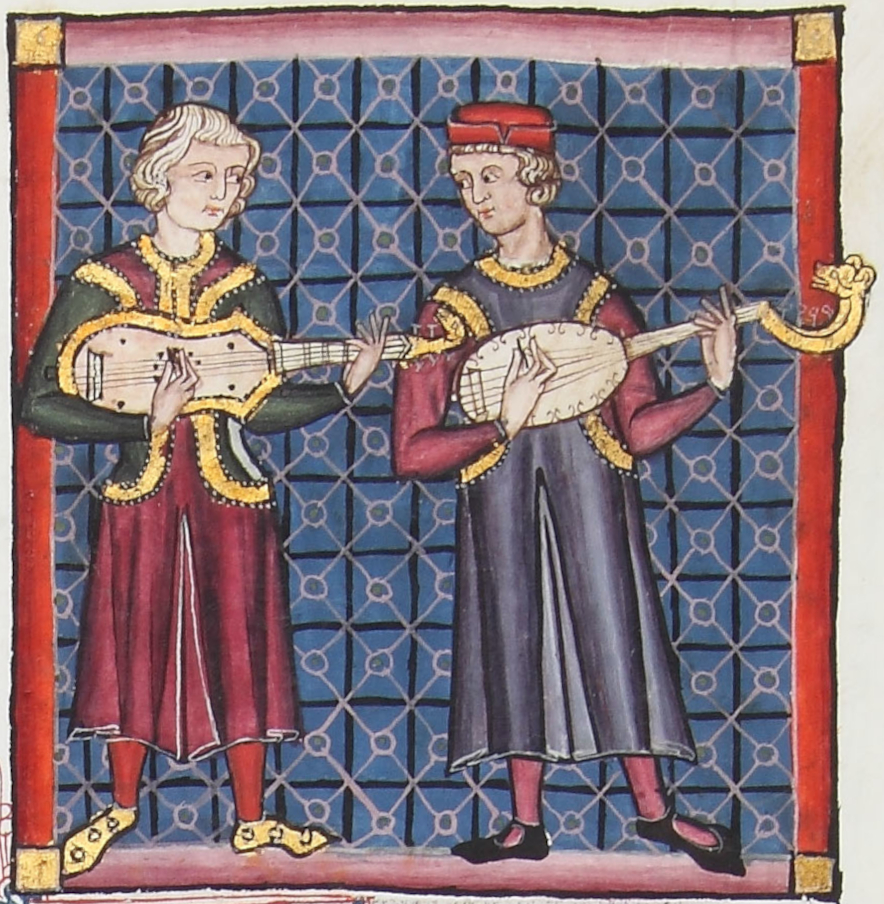
"Guitarra morisca" (right) and guitarra latina (left)

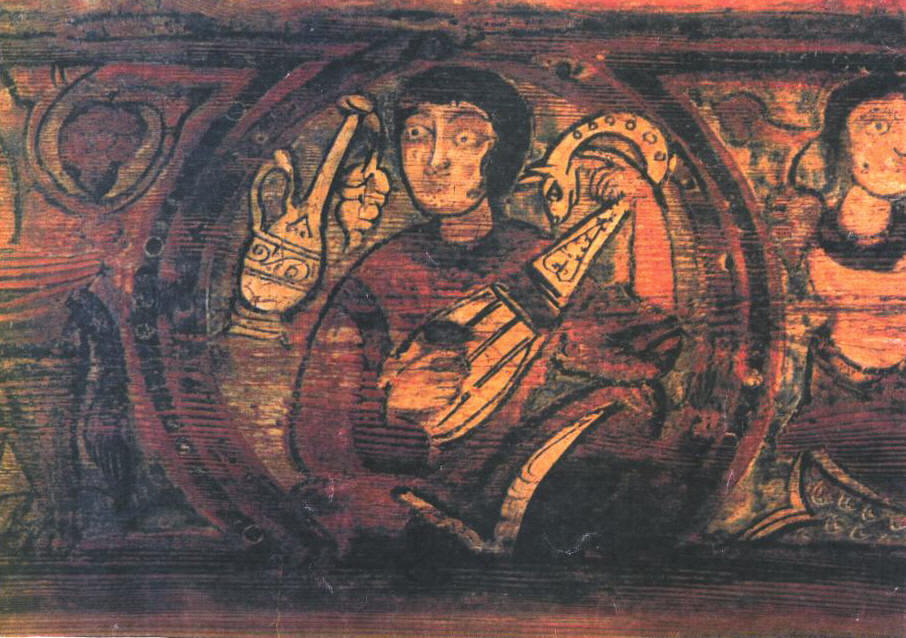
12th Century image from Cefalù Cathedral of a lute-type instrument that has been called a "Guitarra morisca" by a modern builder of ancient instruments. He also called it a Chitarrino Arabo

The Guitarra morisca or Mandora medieval is a plucked string instrument. It is a lute that has a bulging belly and a sickle-shaped headstock. Part of that characterization comes from a c. 1330 poem, Libro de buen amor by Juan Ruiz, arcipestre de Hita, which described the "Moorish gittern" as "corpulent". The use of the adjective morisca tacked to guitarra may have been to differentiate it from the commonly seen Latin European variety, when the morisca was seen on a limited basis during the 14th century.

Appeared in the early 9th century, it is an instrument mentioned in the Cantigas de Santa Maria, and by Johannes de Grocheio (towards 1300) who called it quitarra sarracénica. In the 14th century it is known by the term "guitarra morisca", coined by Arcipreste de Hita in Libro de buen amor. It has similarities to both the guitarra latina and medieval lute, usually played by fingers or plectrum.

It has roots in the four-string Arabic oud, brought to Iberia by the Moors in the 8th century. The guitarra morisca is a direct ancestor of the modern guitar. By the 14th century, the guitarra morisca was simply referred to as a guitar.

The guitarra morisca is an obscure instrument, known mainly from pictures. Early instrument expert Francis William Galpin mentioned the instrument in his book, Old English Instruments of Music (pages 21-22), calling it the "Guitare Moresca" or "Chittara Saraacenica", with its "long neck, oval shaped body and round back." He also felt it related to the Colascione.
