= El Degas guitars =

El Degas or El Dégas was a Japanese label for acoustics and electric guitars built to resemble Gibson guitars, and other major guitar companies' designs and distributed by Buegeleisen & Jacobson of New York, New York.
