= Guitarra latina =

Medieval European plucked string instrument

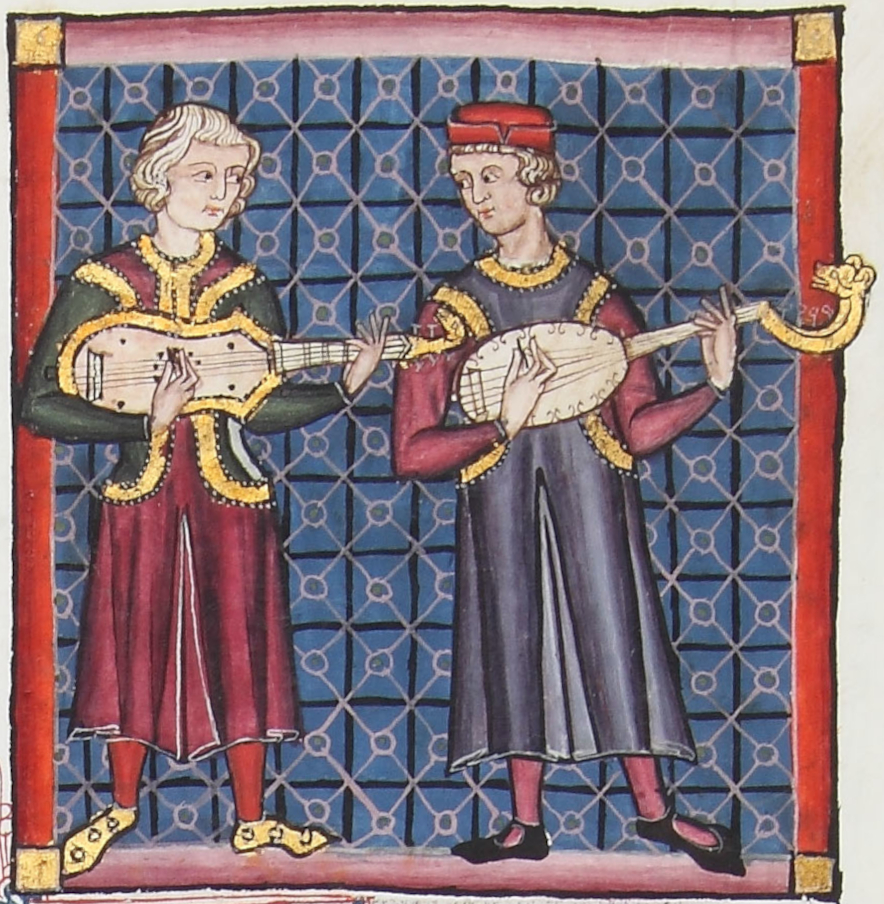
Unlabeled photo from the Cantigas de Santa Maria, Castile/Spain, c. 1300-1340. The left instrument has been called both guitarra latina and citole (left). The other instrument has been called guitarra morisca.

The guitarra latina is a plucked string instrument of the medieval period in Europe. It has single string courses, and it is normally played with a pick. This gittern or citole with curved sides is illustrated in the medieval musical text the Cantigas de Santa Maria, alongside another gittern, the guitarra morisca.
