= Open C tuning =

Guitar tuning

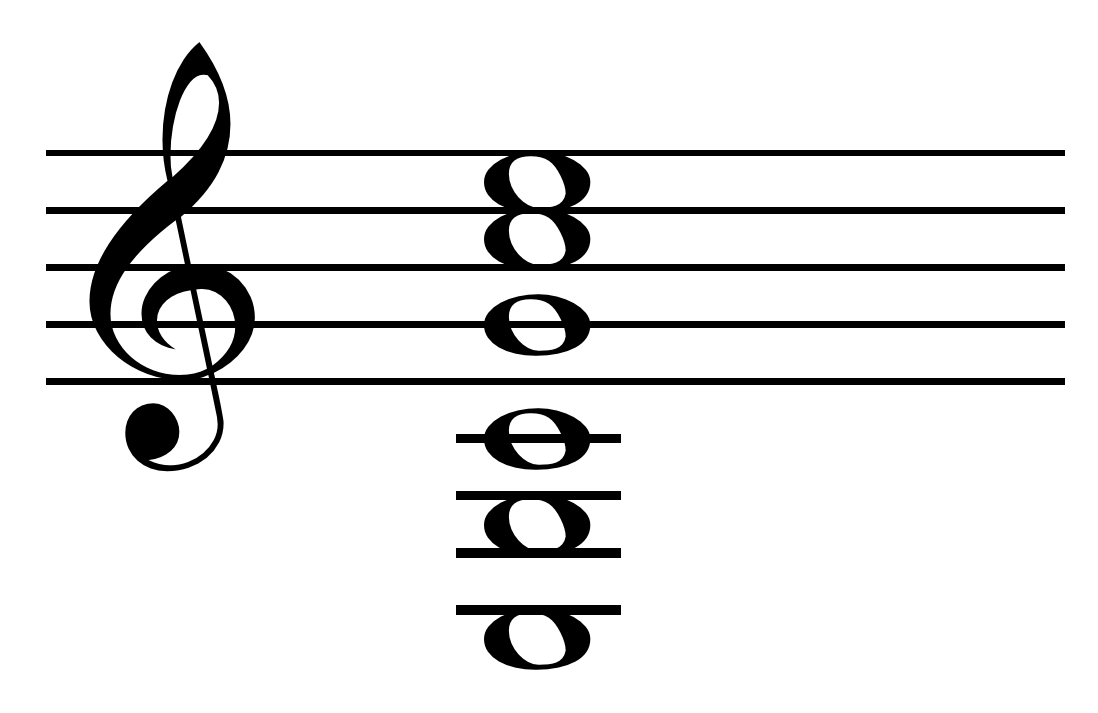
An open C tuning

Open C tuning is an open tuning for guitar. The open-string notes form a C major chord, which is the triad (C,E,G) having the root note C, the major third (C,E), and the perfect fifth (C,G). When the guitar is strummed without fretting any strings, a C-major chord is sounded. By barring all of the strings for one fret (from one to eleven), one finger suffices to fret the other eleven major-chords.

== Examples ==
There are several open C tunings.

=== Repetitive C-E-G-C-E-G ===
The English guitar uses a repetitive open-C tuning

C-E-G-C-E-G,

which is approximately a major-thirds tuning, specifically

C-E-G♯-C-E-G♯=C-E-A♭-C-E-A♭.

=== "C5" variant C-G-C-G-G-E ===
This open C tuning was used by Soundgarden for songs including Pretty Noose, Burden in My Hand, and Head Down. Chord sequences often omit the high E string, leaving the power chord ubiquitous to Grunge music.

=== C-G-C-G-C-E ===
C-G-C-G-C-E.

This open C tuning was used by William Ackerman for his "Townshend Shuffle", by John Fahey for his tribute to Mississippi John Hurt, and by Led Zeppelin's Jimmy Page for "Friends". It is also used by Devin Townsend for the vast majority of his work (The Devin Townsend Project, Strapping Young Lad, Casualties of Cool).

=== Overtones C-C-G-C-E-G ===
C-C-G-C-E-G

Another open C tuning uses the harmonic sequence (overtones) of the note C. When an open-note C-string is struck, its harmonic sequence begins with the notes (C,C,G,C,E,G,B♭,C). The root note is associated with a sequence of intervals, beginning with the unison interval (C,C), the octave interval (C,C), the perfect fifth (C,G), the perfect fourth (G,C), the major third (C,E), and the minor third (E,G); in particular, this sequence of intervals contains the thirds of the C-major chord {(C,E),(E,G)}.

==== C-minor open chord: Cross-note tuning ====
Flattening this open tuning's open-note E to E♭ changes the open chord from C-major to C-minor, so producing the cross-note tuning

C-C--G-C-E♭-G

which enables one-finger minor chords. Like other cross-note tunings, it also allows major chords to be fretted with one adjacent finger.

==== Relation to new standard tuning ====
Many of the notes from the harmonic sequence for C appear in the new standard tuning (NST), which is a nearly regular tuning based on perfect fifths; NST also has (D,A) from the pentatonic scale on C:

C-G-D-A-E-G

NST is used in Guitar Craft (a school of guitar playing founded by King Crimson's Robert Fripp). The open-C overtones tuning has the same range as NST, which can use extreme strings (.011 and .059 inches).

=== C-C-G-C-E-C ===
C-C-G-C-E-C

Using a high C rather than the high G of the overtone series, this open C tuning was used by Mick Ralphs for the songs "Can't Get Enough" and "Movin' On" on Bad Company's debut album. Ralphs said, "It needs the open C to have that ring," and "it never really sounds right in standard tuning".
