= All fourths tuning =

Guitar Tuning

All fourths
- The consecutive open notes of all-fourths tuning are spaced apart by five semitones on the chromatic circle, which lists the twelve notes of the octave.

Basic information
- Aliases: Perfect-fourths tuning
- Interval: Perfect fourth
- Semitones: 5
- Example(s): E-A-D-G-C-F

Advanced information
- Other instruments: Bass guitar
- Repetition: No
- Advantages: Closely approximates standard tuning
- Disadvantages: Difficult to play conventional music, especially barre chords
- Left-handed tuning: All-fifths tuning

Associated musician
- Guitarist: Stanley Jordan; Alex Hutchings; Tom Quayle
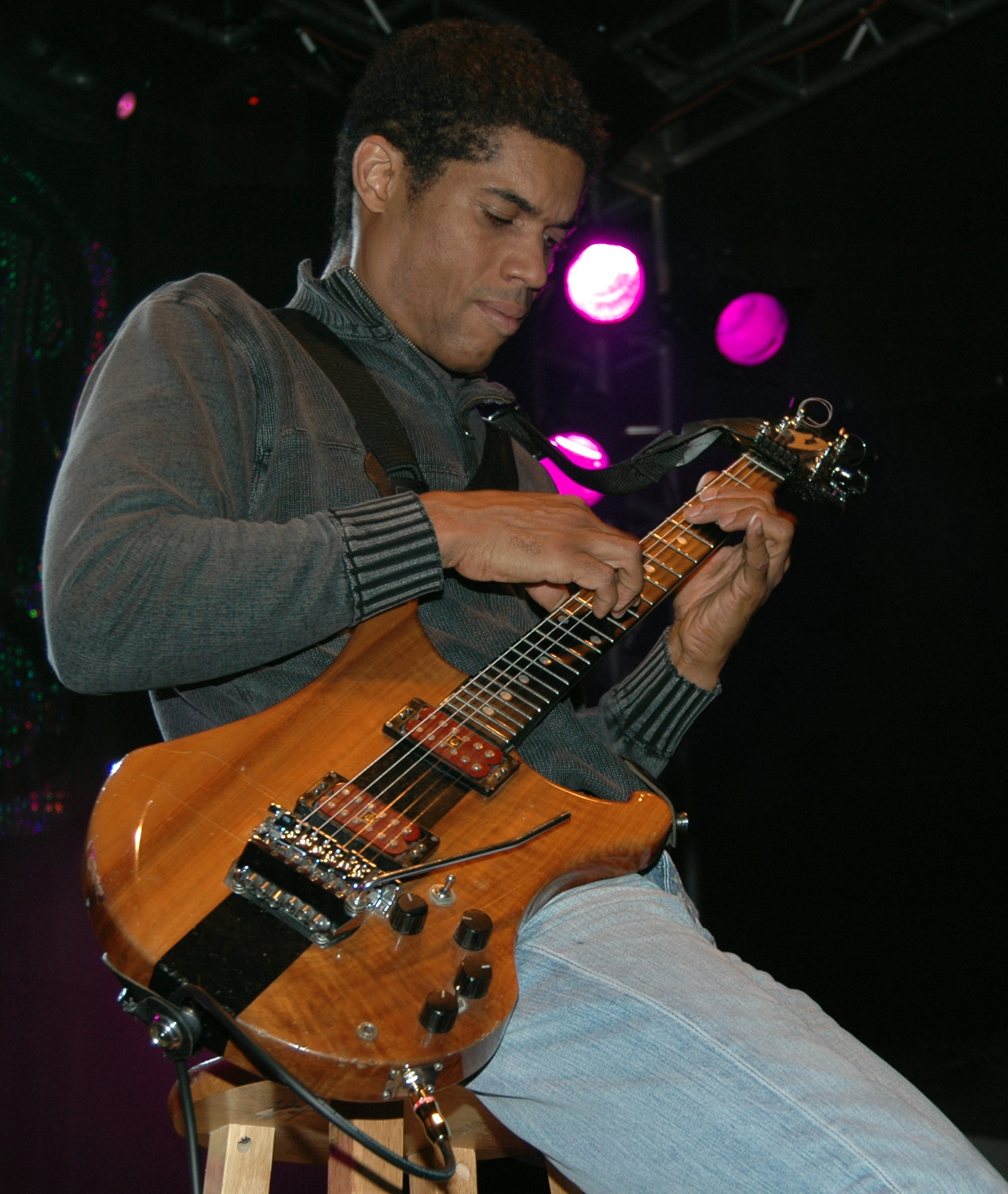
- Jazz musician Stanley Jordan stated that all-fourths tuning "simplifies the fingerboard, making it logical".

Regular tunings (semitones)
- Trivial (0)
- Minor thirds (3)
- Major thirds (4)
- All fourths (5)
- Augmented fourths (6)
- New standard (7, 3)
- All fifths (7)
- Minor sixths (8)

Among alternative tunings for the guitar, all-fourths tuning is a regular tuning. In contrast, the standard tuning has one irregularity—a major third between the third and second strings—while having perfect fourths between the other successive strings. The standard tuning's irregular major-third is replaced by a perfect fourth in all-fourths tuning, which has the open notes E2-A2-D3-G3-C4-F4.

The note layouts on the fretboard of a guitar tuned in perfect 4ths, with arrows that show where the same note continues on a higher-pitched string. All adjacent strings have the same interval and repeat at the 5th fret, unlike standard guitar tuning which has an inconsistency between the 2nd and 3rd strings.

Among regular tunings, this all-fourths tuning best approximates the standard tuning.

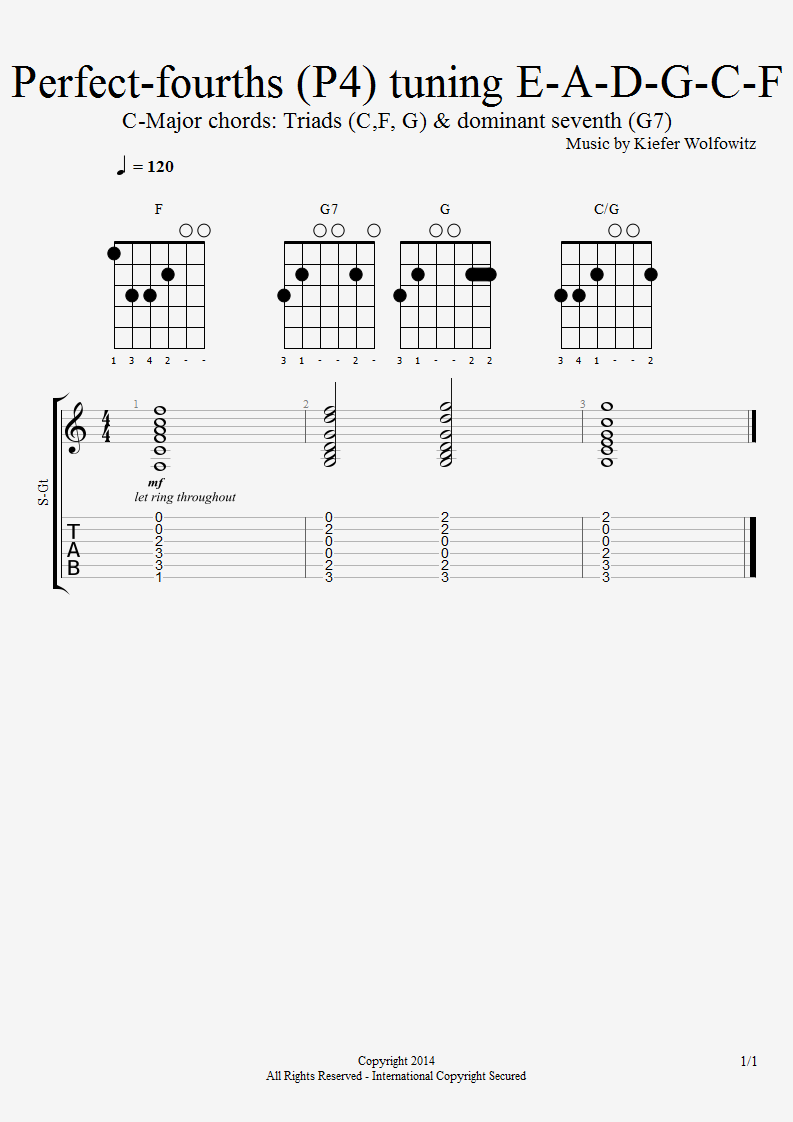
Open chords for beginners.

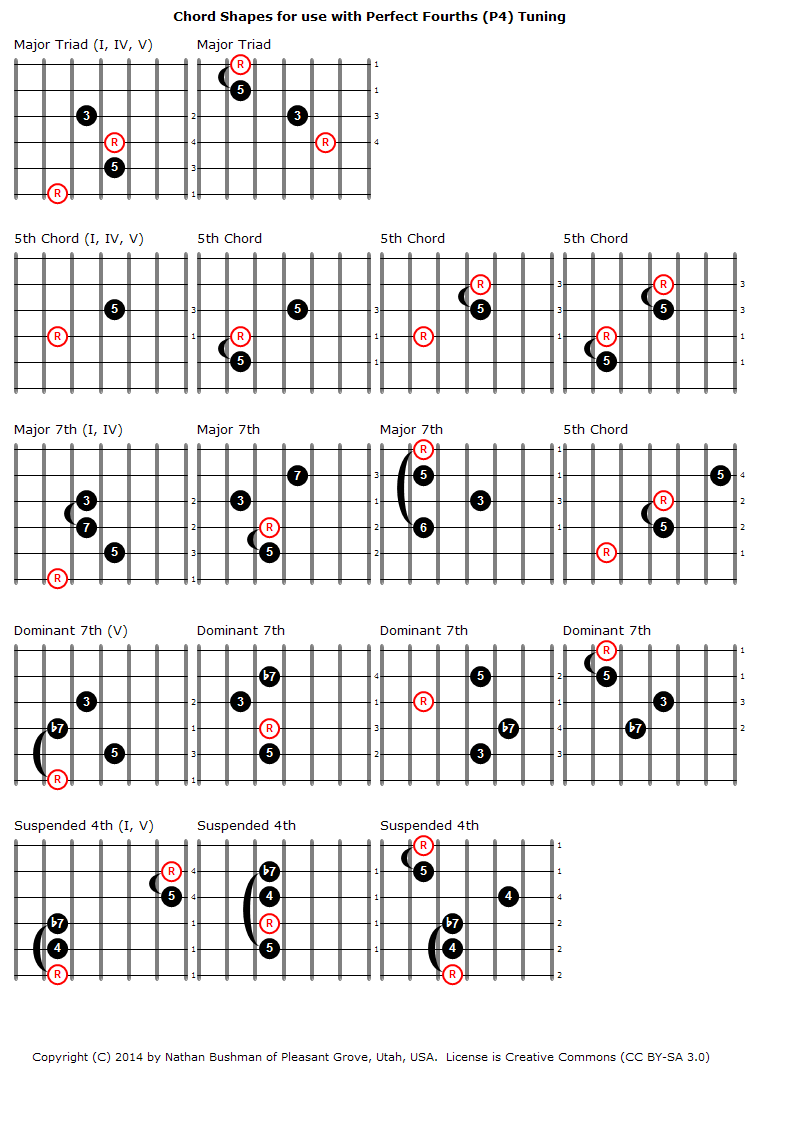
These chord shapes can be moved across the fretboard, unlike the chord shapes of standard tuning.

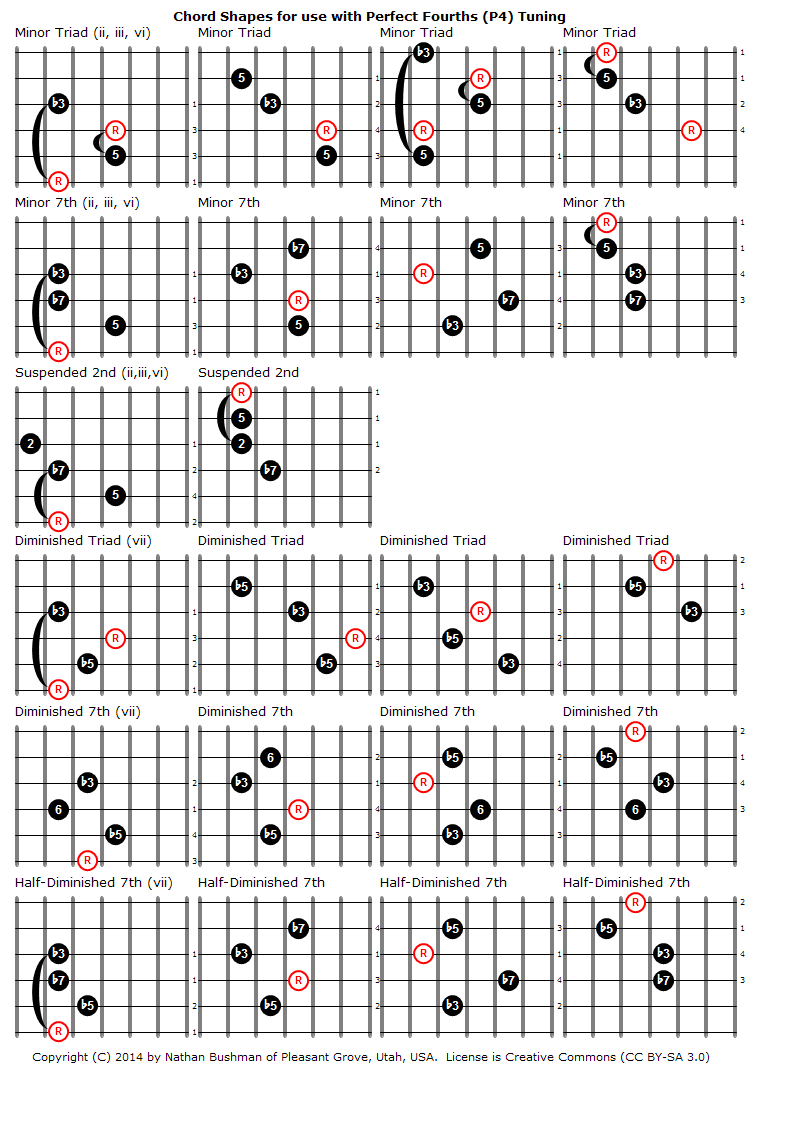
More movable chord-shapes.

In all guitar tunings, the higher-octave version of a chord can be found by translating a chord by twelve frets higher along the fretboard. In every regular tuning, for example in all-fourths tuning, chords and intervals can be moved also diagonally. For all-fourths tuning, all twelve major chords (in the first or open positions) are generated by two chords, the open F major chord and the D major chord. The regularity of chord-patterns reduces the number of finger positions that need to be memorized. Jazz musician Stanley Jordan plays guitar in all-fourths tuning; he has stated that all-fourths tuning "simplifies the fingerboard, making it logical".

Among all regular tunings, all-fourths tuning E-A-D-G-C-F is the best approximation of standard tuning, which is more popular. All-fourths tuning is traditionally used for the bass guitar; it is also used for the bajo sexto.

Allan Holdsworth stated that if he were to learn the guitar again he would tune it in all-fourths.

== Relation with all-fifths tuning ==
All-fourths tuning is closely related to all-fifths tuning. All-fourths tuning is based on the perfect fourth (five semitones), and all-fifths tuning is based on the perfect fifth (seven semitones). The perfect-fifth and perfect-fourth intervals are inversions of one another, and the chords of all-fourth and all-fifths are paired as inverted chords. Consequently, chord charts for all-fifths tunings may be used for left-handed all-fourths tuning.

== Players who use all fourths tuning ==
- Stanley Jordan
- Alex Hutchings
- Tom Quayle
- Deirdre Cartwright
- Graham Young
- Ant Law (E♭2, A♭2, D♭3, G♭3, B3, E4)
- Gyárfás István
- Miki Birta (D2, G2, C3, F3, B♭3, E♭4)
- Folk Iván
- Icaro Jorge Pulecio
- Mike Mushok is using a Drop-G# all-fourths tuning

== See also ==
- Scordatura, alternative tunings of stringed instruments
- Laúd and bandurria, Spanish six-course plucked string instruments tuned in fourths
- Puerto Rican cuatro, five-course plucked string instrument tuned in fourths
- commons:Category:Perfect fourths tuning charts and diagrams for P4 tuning
