= Open G tuning =

Alternative tuning for the guitar

Among alternative tunings for the guitar, an open G tuning is an open tuning that features the G-major chord; its open notes are selected from the notes of a G-major chord, such as the G-major triad (G,B,D). For example, a popular open-G tuning is

D–G–D–G–B–D (low to high).

An open-G tuning allows a G-major chord to be strummed on all six strings with neither fretting of the left hand nor a capo. Like other open tunings, it allows the eleven major chords besides G major each to be strummed by barring at most one finger on exactly one fret.

== Usages in music ==
Open G tuning allows for open strings and single-fret bar chords to be played in key which make techniques such as slide and steel guitar viable. Open G tuning is common in blues and folk music (along with other open tunings).

Open G tuning particularly common in guitar music of Hawaiian origin including guitar styles such as slack-key guitar and steel guitar. In the context of slack-key music, open G is often referred to "Taro Patch" tuning (the term stems from taro, a traditional staple cuisine of Polynesian Hawaii). However, guitar is not a traditional Polynesian instrument; it was introduced to Hawaii by vaqueros hired by King Kamehameha III to assist with the nascent Hawaiian ranching industry in the mid 19th century.

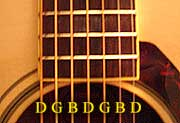
The seven-string Russian guitar uses the open-G tuning D–G–B–D–G–B–D.

Repetitive open-G tunings are used by Russian guitars, Dobro guitars, and banjos. They repeat three open-string notes.

The repetitive open-G tuning

D–G–B–D–G–B–D

is used by the Russian guitar, which has seven strings tuned mostly in triads, in contrast to other guitars, which are tuned mostly in fourths.

Dobros use a full six-string tuning with a bottom G: G–B–D–G–B–D, low to high. The two lowest strings are, accordingly, tuned three semitones higher for the lowest string (from E up to G) and two semitones higher for the second-lowest string (from A up to B) while the highest string is tuned two semitones lower (from E down to D), relative to standard tuning.

Five-string banjo's standard tuning is also an Open G: g–D–G–B–D, where the lower case "g" denotes the highest-pitched "drone string", physically located next to (above) the lowest-pitched string, the first upper case "D".

Alan Sparhawk of Low has been using an Open G tuning his entire musical career, since being inspired by Sonic Youth as a kid. Some of the most common shapes in Open G can be heard in Stornoway's November Song (DGDGBD) and Here Comes the Blackout (the subtly altered DGDGBE).

== Overtones of the fundamental note G ==
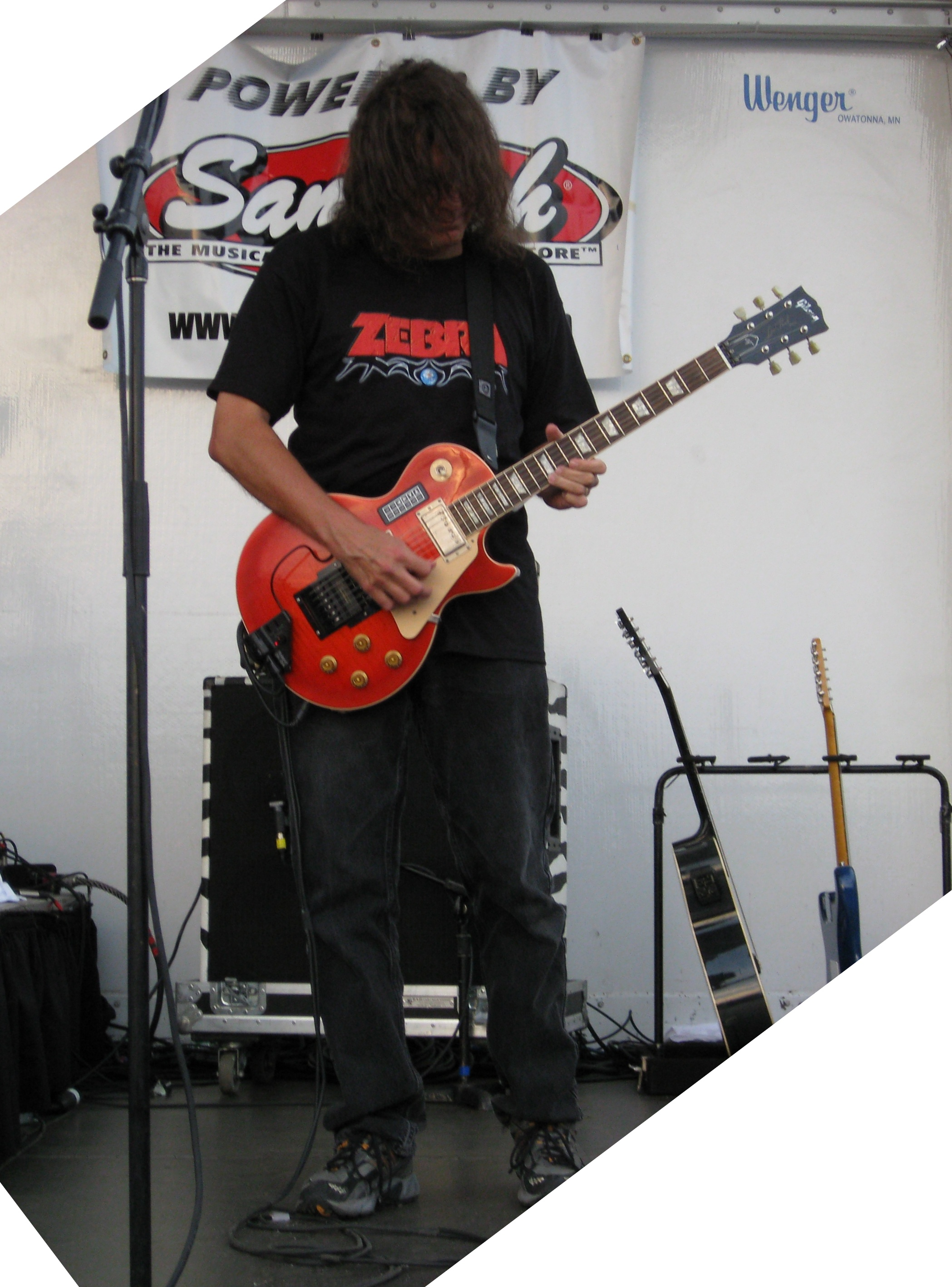
Zebra's Randy Jackson played "Who's Behind the Door?" using the same open-G overtones-tuning.

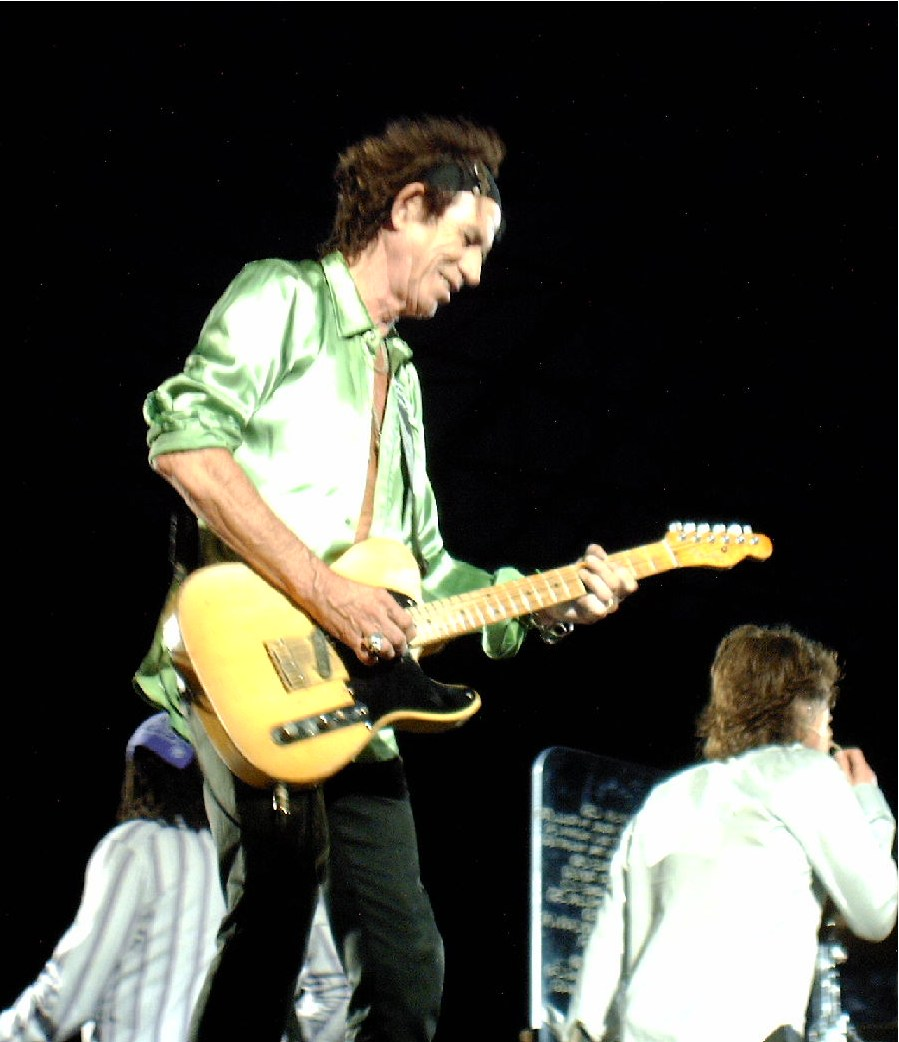
The Rolling Stones's Keith Richards plays a five-string 1953 Telecaster in open-G tuning.

Bad Company guitarist Mick Ralphs has used another open-G tuning, which listed the initial six overtones of the G note,

G–G–D–G–B–D
for "Hey Hey" and while writing the demo of "Can't Get Enough".

The overtones tuning G–G–D–G–B–D was used by Joni Mitchell for "Electricity", "For the Roses", and "Hunter (The Good Samaritan)". Truncating this tuning to G-D-G-B-D for his five-string guitar, Keith Richards plays this overtones-tuning on the Rolling Stones' "Honky Tonk Women", "Brown Sugar" and "Start Me Up". American rock band Eagles of Death Metal uses this tuning for the majority of their songs.

== See also ==
- Minor thirds tuning
- Scordatura, alternative tunings of stringed instruments
- Stringed instrument tunings
