= New standard tuning =

Alternative guitar tuning

New standard
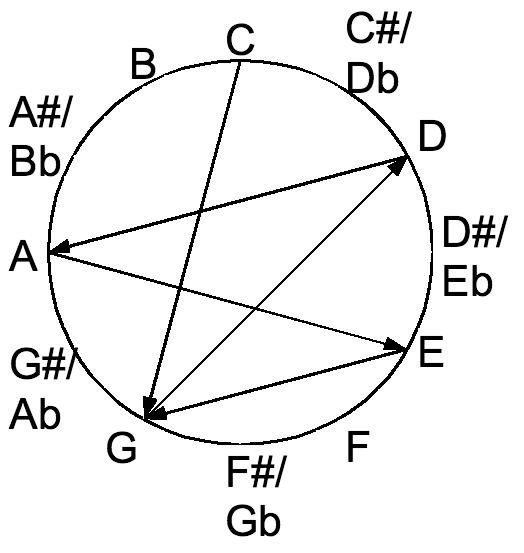
- Five consecutive open-notes of new standard tuning are spaced seven semitones apart on the chromatic circle; the highest interval is only three semitones apart.

Basic information
- Aliases: Guitar Craft tuning
- Interval: Perfect fifth
- Semitones: 7
- Example(s): C–G–D–A–E–G

Advanced information
- Repetition: No
- Advantages: Approximates all-fifths tuning; wide range
- Disadvantages: Very difficult to play standard-guitar music
- Left-handed tuning: All-fourths tuning (approximately)

Associated musician
- Guitarist: Robert Fripp
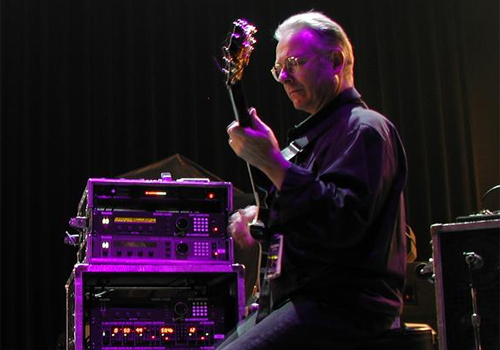
- Robert Fripp has taught new standard tuning to his Guitar Craft students

Regular tunings (semitones)
- Trivial (0)
- Minor thirds (3)
- Major thirds (4)
- All fourths (5)
- Augmented fourths (6)
- New standard (7, 3)
- All fifths (7)
- Minor sixths (8)

New standard tuning (NST) is an alternative tuning for the guitar that approximates all-fifths tuning. The guitar's strings are assigned the notes C_{2}–G_{2}–D_{3}–A_{3}–E_{4}–G_{4} (from lowest to highest); the five lowest open strings are each tuned to an interval of a perfect fifth {(C,G),(G,D),(D,A),(A,E)}; the two highest strings are a minor third apart (E,G).

All-fifths tuning is typically used for mandolins, cellos, violas, and violins. On a guitar, tuning the strings in fifths would mean the first string would be a high B. NST provides a good approximation to all-fifths tuning. Like other regular tunings, NST allows chord fingerings to be shifted from one set of strings to another.

NST's C–G range is wider, both lower and higher, than the E–E range of standard tuning in which the strings are tuned to the open notes E_{2}–A_{2}–D_{3}–G_{3}–B_{3}–E_{4}. The greater range allows NST guitars to play repertoire that would be impractical, if not impossible, on a standard-tuned guitar.

NST was developed by Robert Fripp, the guitarist for King Crimson. Fripp taught the new standard tuning in Guitar Craft courses beginning in 1985, and many Guitar Craft students continue to use the tuning. Like other alternative tunings for guitar, NST provides challenges and new opportunities to guitarists, who have developed music especially suited to NST.

NST places the guitar strings under greater tension than standard tuning. Standard sets of guitar strings do not work well with the tuning as the lowest strings are too loose and the highest string may snap under the increased tension. Special sets of NST strings have been available for decades, and some guitarists assemble NST sets from individual strings.

== History ==
The open strings of new standard tuning

Audio file of new standard tuning's open notes

New standard tuning (NST) was invented by guitarist Robert Fripp of the band King Crimson in September 1983.

"I was in the Apple Health Spa on Bleecker and Thompson [in New York City] back in September 1983, in the sauna at half past 10 in the morning, almost asleep, and the tuning flew over my head. At the time I couldn't understand what it was for. I was asked to give a guitar seminar at Claymont Court in December 1984, to raise funds for the running of the estate and the children's school. There was a click and I realized the tuning was for the guitar class."

Fripp began using the tuning in 1985 before beginning his Guitar Craft seminars.

String (right-handed)	Note	Frequency (hertz)
1	g'	392.00
2	e'	329.63
3	a	220.00
4	d	146.83
5	G	98.66
6	C	65.41

The tuning is (from low to high): C_{2}–G_{2}–D_{3}–A_{3}–E_{4}–G_{4}. The original version of NST was all-fifths tuning. However, in the 1980s, Fripp never attained the all-fifth's high B. While he could attain A, the string's lifetime was too short. Experimenting with a G string, Fripp succeeded. "Originally, seen in 5ths all the way, the top string would not go to B. So, as on a tenor banjo, I adopted an A on the first string. These kept breaking, so G was adopted." In 2012, Fripp suggested that Guitar Circle members experiment with an A string (0.007) from Octave4Plus of Gary Goodman; if successful, the experiment could lead to "the NST 1.2", C2G2D3A3E4-A4, according to Fripp. In 2010, Fripp suggested renaming the tuning as "Guitar Craft Standard Tuning or C Pentatonic tuning".

== Properties ==
Chord diagrams for new standard tuning

The lowest five strings are tuned in perfect fifths from a low C. The first string is a minor third up from the E to a G. Since the lowest five strings are tuned in fifths, guitars with NST can be played with the fingerings for chords and scales used on the violin, cello, and mandolin.

The first five strings of NST have all-fifths tuning, and so its all-fifths chords are movable around the fretboard. In contrast, standard tuning has an irregular major-third interjected among its perfect fourths, which complicates the learning of chords by beginners.

The distinct open notes are from the major pentatonic scale on C, which contains only consonant intervals. The C-pentatonic scale omits the open B of standard tuning and all-fifths tuning, which forms a dissonant second-interval with C. With the 1980s King Crimson, Fripp had used pentatonic harmony in "Discipline", "Thela Hun Ginjeet", and "Sartori in Tangier".

=== Harmonics: Overtones ===
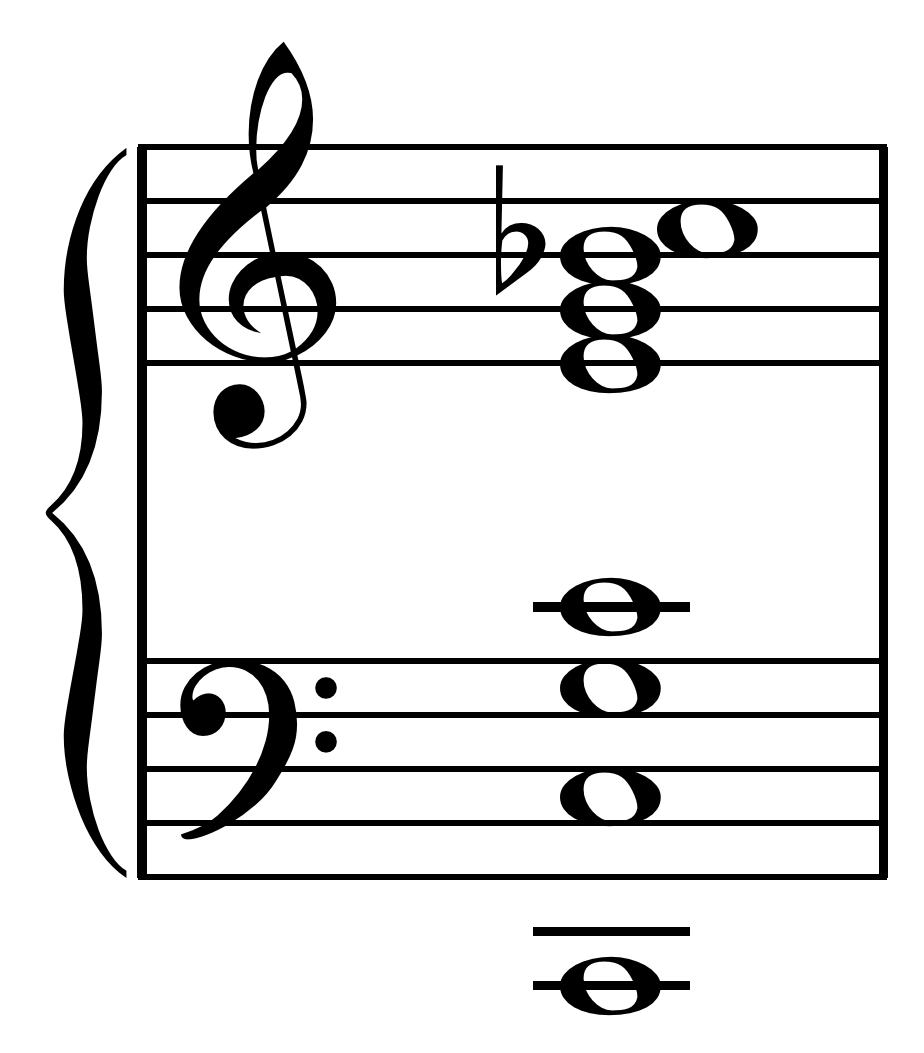
Initial eight harmonics on C, namely (C,C,G,C,E,G,B♭,C)

"With a note of music, one strikes the fundamental, and, in addition to the root note, other notes are generated: these are the harmonic series.... As one fundamental note contains within it other notes in the octave, two fundamentals produce a remarkable array of harmonics, and the number of possible combinations between all the notes increases phenomenally. With a triad, affairs stand a good chance of getting severely out of hand."

— Robert Fripp, Denyer (1992, p. 114)

New standard tuning lists four notes (C,G,E,G) from the harmonic sequence (overtones) for the note C. When the low open-note C-string is struck, its harmonic sequence begins with the notes

(C,C,G,C,E,G,B♭,C).

To strengthen a given chord, Vincent Persichetti's Twentieth-century harmony recommends adding perfect fifths above the initial overtones, rather than adding higher overtones, such as B♭ and the higher C. Persichetti's book influenced Fripp. In new standard tuning

- C is the fundamental overtone,
- G as a fifth reinforces C,
- D as a fifth reinforces G,
- A as a fifth reinforces D,
- E both as a fifth reinforces A and as the fifth overtone reinforces C, and
- G as the sixth overtone reinforces C.

=== Range ===
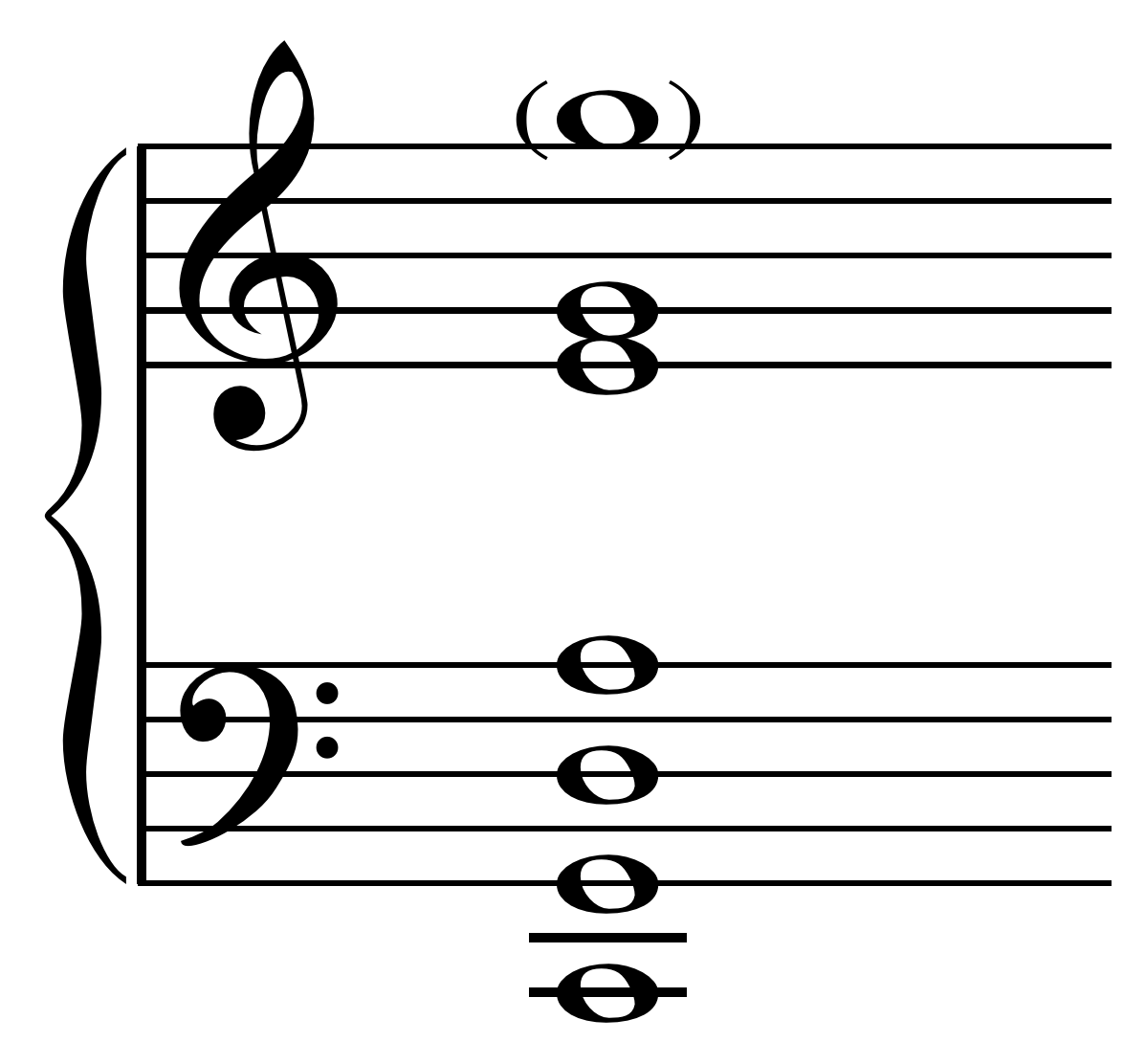
New standard tuning's range.

Like all-fifths tuning, NST has a greater range than the standard tuning, a perfect fifth greater (a major third lower and a minor third higher).

=== Chords: Perfect intervals rather than thirds ===
Asked whether NST facilitates "new intervals or harmonies that aren't readily available in standard tuning", Fripp responded, "Yes, that's part of it. It's more effective. It's a more rational system, but it's also better sounding—better for chords, better for single notes." To build chords, Fripp uses "perfect intervals in fourths, fifths and octaves", so avoiding minor and major thirds. Quartal and quintal harmony was stressed from the beginning of Fripp's teaching of Guitar Craft. Fripp began a 1986 course with these directions: "Now, pick a note from the following series—[it was a series of fourths or fifths]. When you are ready—do not be in any hurry, but when you are ready play your note, then pick others and play them as the situation demands it. Your first note will be the first intentional note you have played in a week."

It is a challenge to adapt conventional guitar chords to new standard tuning. NST has wider intervals between consecutive strings than standard tuning.

"Most songs (that is music which has both words and instrumental accompaniments) written in the [NST] have a quality of walking on long stilts. There are rarely many intervals, harmonic or melodic, in these guitar accompaniments that are closer than a major third except in the top of the voicing. Close voicings (from a single guitar) in [NST] are possible thanks to the minor third between the first and second string, and this is often the only practical place where close voicings occur with any regularity".

=== Historical background ===
Modern quartal and quintal harmony revives the polyphonic traditions of medieval Europe. Before the common practice period, European polyphony emphasized unison intervals and octaves and also perfect fifths. From the Renaissance to 1900, Western symphonic music was diatonic, emphasizing the tertian harmony of major and minor scales, keys, and chords. Much popular music, especially rock, retains diatonic harmony.

== String gauges ==
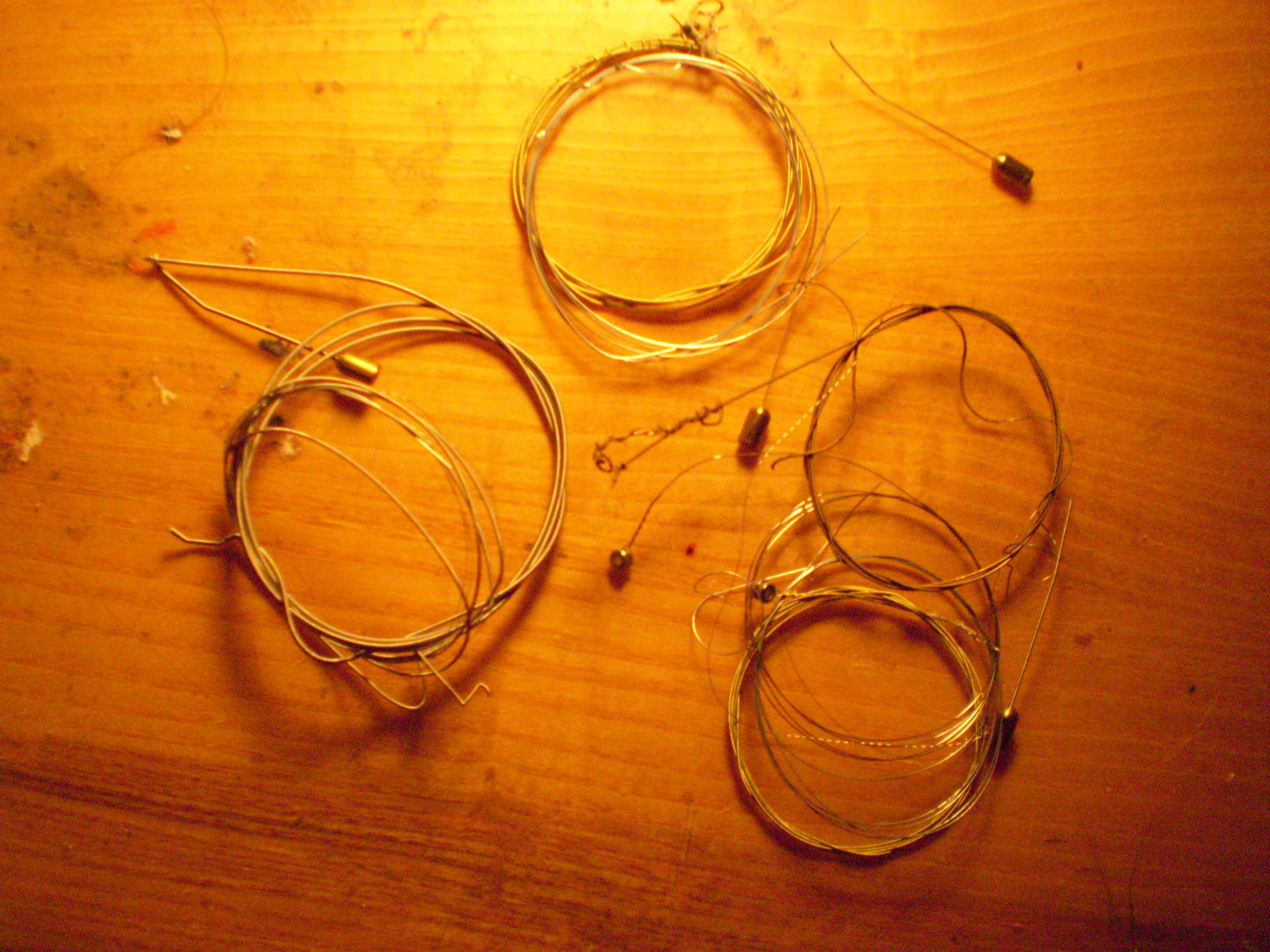
Guitar strings that were designed for the high E of standard tuning can be tuned to NST's high G with greater tension and shorter lifetimes.

With traditional guitar strings, the low C may be loose and the high G may be too tight. Special gauges are therefore more suitable for NST. For steel-stringed acoustic-guitars, many Guitar Craft participants use either an .011–.058 inch set or an .011–.059 inch set; string-sets may be purchased as a set from a manufacturer or purchased singly and assembled by the guitarist.

Steel-string gauges (inches) for acoustic guitars
G_{1}	E_{2}	A_{3}	D_{4}	G_{5}	C_{6}	Distributor
0.011	0.013	0.023	0.032	0.046	0.056	Guitar Craft Services (Unavailable in 2012)
0.012	0.015	0.023	0.032	0.046	0.060	Guitar Craft Services (Unavailable in 2012)
0.011	0.013	0.022	0.032	0.047	0.058	John Pearse Strings, manufacturer
0.011	0.013	0.022	0.032	0.047	0.059	D'Addario, manufacturer (available at Guitar Circle courses)
0.010					0.052 (light)	Newtone Strings

In 2012, a 0.007 inch gauge was being evaluated by Fripp and other members of Guitar Circle, who are considering replacing the first string's G note with an A note, the better to approximate the B note of all-fifths tuning. The 0.007 inch gauge was produced by Octave4Plus of Gary Goodman. Robert Fripp uses lighter strings for electric guitar.

Gauges for electric guitars
G_{1}	E_{2}	A_{3}	D_{4}	G_{5}	C_{6}	Reference
0.010	0.012	0.016	0.024	0.038	0.052	Robert Fripp
0.008	0.012	0.015	0.026	0.042	0.052	Curt Golden

== Artists who use new standard tuning ==
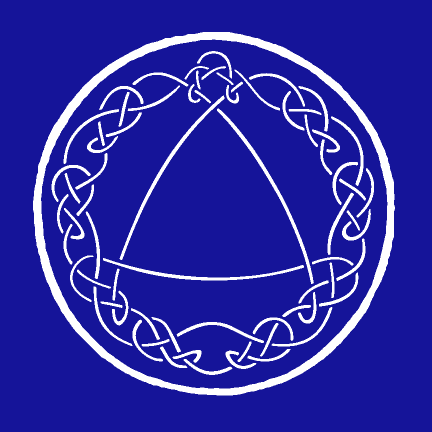
New standard tuning was taught first by Fripp in the courses of Guitar Craft, whose knotwork symbol is pictured.

Robert Fripp currently uses the new standard tuning, beginning in 1984.

Fripp has taught new standard tuning in his Guitar Craft courses. In Guitar Craft and in the 2010 successor Guitar Circles, students use only new standard tuning. Having to use a new tuning challenges students to approach their playing with greater mindfulness and to explore new ways of musical expression.

Guitar Craft alumni who continue to practice new standard tuning are called "crafty guitarists" or "crafties". Some crafty guitarists formed the League of Crafty Guitarists, which toured with Robert Fripp and have released multiple albums. Guitar-Craft and the League of Crafty Guitarists have trained guitarists who went on to form new bands, such as the Trey Gunn and the California Guitar Trio; Gunn and the California Guitar Trio have toured with Fripp as the Robert Fripp String Quintet. Other alumni of the League of Crafty Guitarists include members of Los Gauchos Alemanes, such as U.S. guitarist Steve Ball; Ball is associated with the Seattle Guitar Circle, along with League of Craft Guitarists alumnus Curt Golden. The collection A Plague of Crafty Guitarists features many NST players including Nigel Gavin. New standard tuning has been adapted for instruments besides guitar. Trey Gunn (Crimson's warr guitar player from 1994 to 2003) and Markus Reuter have adapted new standard tuning for their 8- and 10-string instruments; in 2007 Reuter used a B♭-F-C-G-D-A-C-D tuning. Finnish musician Heikki Malmberg uses a 7-string guitar tuned in new standard tuning with an additional low F.

== See also ==
- Major thirds tuning
- List of guitar tunings
