= Augmented-fourths tuning =

Augmented fourths
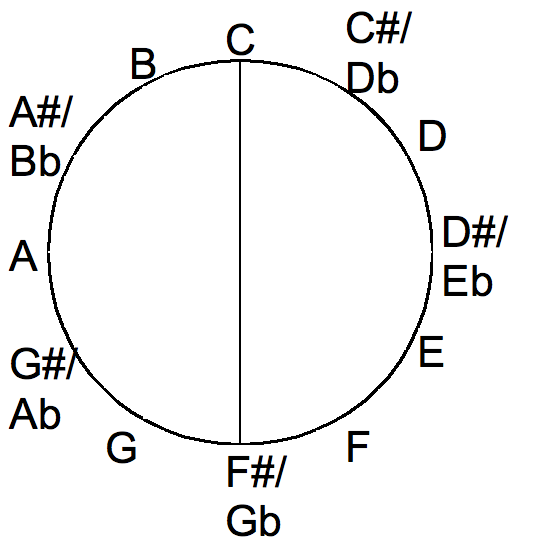
- For every augmented-fourths tuning, the interval between successive open-strings is six semitones, half the circumference of the chromatic circle.

Basic information
- Aliases: All-tritone tuning, Diminished-fifth tuning
- Interval: Augmented fourth
- Semitones: 6
- Example(s): C-F♯-c-f♯-c'-f '♯ B-F-b-f-b'-f'

Advanced information
- Repetition: After 2 strings
- Advantages: Simplified fretboard
- Disadvantages: Only two open-string notes
- Left-handed tuning: Augmented-fourths tuning

Associated musician
- Guitarist: Shawn Lane

Regular tunings (semitones)
- Trivial (0)
- Minor thirds (3)
- Major thirds (4)
- All fourths (5)
- Augmented fourths (6)
- New standard (7, 3)
- All fifths (7)
- Minor sixths (8)

In the standard guitar-tuning, one major-third interval is interjected amid four perfect-fourth intervals.

Standard tuning (listen)

Among alternative tunings for guitar, each augmented-fourths tuning is a regular tuning in which the musical intervals between successive open-string notes are each augmented fourths. Because augmented fourths are alternatively called "tritones" ("tri-tones") or "diminished fifths", augmented-fourths tuning is also called tritone tuning or diminished-fifths tuning.

The standard guitar-tuning

E-A-d-g-b'-e'

interjects exactly one major third amid four perfect fourths for the intervals between its successive open strings. In contrast, the augmented fourths tunings

C-F♯-c-f♯-c'-f '♯ and
B-F-b-f-b'-f'

have only augmented-fourths intervals.

The set of augmented-fourths tunings has three properties that simplify learning by beginners and improvisation by experts: Regular intervals, string repetition, and lefty-righty symmetry. These properties characterize augmented-fourths tunings among non-trivial tunings.

== Properties ==
In modern music, the twelve notes of the octave are equally space around the chromatic circle. On this circle, there are six pairs of antipodal notes, each representing an augmented-fourth interval. Each such pair specifies the successive open-strings of an augmented-fourths tuning.

The set of augmented-fourths tunings has three properties that simplify learning by beginners and improvisation by experts: Regular intervals, string repetition, and lefty-righty symmetry.

Besides the set of augmented-fourths tuning, exactly one other set of tunings has these three properties—the trivial class of one-note tunings, which contains the C-C-C-C-C-C tuning, for example.

Augmented-fourths tunings have extended range. Because each of its tritone-intervals between successive strings is wider than the perfect-fourth intervals (and one major third) of standard tuning, augmented-fourths tunings have greater range than standard tuning—six additional notes, only one less note than Robert Fripp's new standard tuning.

=== Regular intervals ===
In each regular tuning, the musical intervals are the same for each pair of consecutive strings. Other regular tunings include major-thirds, all-fourths, and all-fifths tunings. For each regular tuning, chord patterns may be moved around the fretboard, a property that simplifies beginners' learning of chords and that simplifies advanced players' improvisation.

=== Thrice repeated open-string notes ===
Two other regular tunings, all-fourths and all-fifths tunings, have strings with five and six distinct open-notes, respectively. Thus, they have no repetition of open-notes, and so they require that the guitarist remember five and six strings, respectively.

In contrast, augmented fourths is a repetitive tuning that begins the next octave after two strings. These tunings' repetition of open-string notes again simplifies the learning of chords and improvisation.

=== Left-handed involution ===
For left-handed guitars, the ordering of the strings reverse the ordering of right-handed guitars. Consequently, left-handed tunings have different chords than right-handed tunings. Regular guitar-tunings have the property that their left-handed ("lefty" versions) are also regular tunings. For example, the left-handed version of all-fourths tuning is all-fifths tuning, and the left-handed version of all-fifths tuning is all-fourths tuning. In general, the left-handed involute of the regular tuning based on the interval with $n$ semitones is the regular tuning based on its involuted interval with $12-n$ semitones: All-fourths tuning is based on the perfect fourth (five semitones), and all-fifths tuning is based on the perfect fifth (seven semitones), as mentioned previously.

The left-handed involute of an augmented-fourth tuning is the augmented-fourths tuning with the same open-string notes. "The augmented-fourth interval is the only interval whose inverse is the same as itself. The augmented-fourths tuning is the only tuning (other than the 'trivial' tuning C-C-C-C-C-C) for which all chords-forms remain unchanged when the strings are reversed. Thus the augmented-fourths tuning is its own 'lefty' tuning."

== Examples ==
The "standard tuning" consists of perfect fourths and a single major-third between the G (g) and B (b') strings:

E-A-d-g-b'-e'

=== C-F♯-C-F♯-C-F♯ ===
Of all the augmented-fourths tunings, the C-F♯-c-f♯-c'-f '♯ tuning is the closest approximation to the standard tuning, and its fretboard is displayed next:

Augmented-fourths tuning C-F♯
| | open (0th fret) | 1st fret | 2nd fret | 3rd fret | 4th fret | 5th fret |
| 1st string | f '♯ | g' | g'♯ | a" | a"♯ | b" |
| 2nd string | c' | c'♯ | d' | d'♯ | e' | f ' |
| 3rd string | f♯ | g | g♯ | a' | a'♯ | b' |
| 4th string | c | c♯ | d | d♯ | e | f |
| 5th string | F♯ | G | G♯ | a | a♯ | b |
| 6th string | C | C♯ | D | D♯ | E | F |

Each fret displays the open strings of exactly one augmented-fourths tuning.

=== B-F-B-F-B-F ===
There are no sharps or flats in the open strings of exactly one augmented-fourths tuning, that with only B and F notes (B-F-b-f-b'-f'). This tuning would appear, for the C-F♯ augmented-fourths tuning displayed above, to the left of the open strings, at the negative-first fret.

Augmented-fourths B-F tuning
| | open (0th fret) | 1st fret | 2nd fret | 3rd fret | 4th fret | 5th fret |
| 1st string | f ' | f '♯ | g' | g'♯ | a" | a"♯ |
| 2nd string | b' | c' | c'♯ | d' | d'♯ | e' |
| 3rd string | f | f♯ | g | g♯ | a' | a'♯ |
| 4th string | b | c | c♯ | d | d♯ | e |
| 5th string | F | F♯ | G | G♯ | a | a♯ |
| 6th string | B | C | C♯ | D | D♯ | E |

This tuning "makes it very easy for playing half-whole scales, diminished 7 licks, and whole tone scales," stated guitarist Ron Jarzombek, who has used it on two albums. Kurt Ballou of Converge used the tuning extensively on the 2001 album Jane Doe. He refers to it as “Open Slayer” and considers it a play on Sonic Youth’s famed CFCFCF tuning. This tuning was used in "Tri 7/5" by Shawn Lane (The Tri-Tone Fascination and Powers of Ten; Live!).

== See also ==
- Scordatura
