= Ostrich guitar =

Guitar tuning scheme in which all strings are tuned to the same note

Trivial tuning
- Trivial tuning contains only one note, for example C.

Basic information
- Aliases: Ostrich (D-D-D-D-d-d)
- Interval: Unison
- Semitones: 0
- Example(s): C-C-C-C-C-C

Advanced information
- Repetition: Immediately
- Left-handed tuning: Trivial

Associated musician
- Guitarist: Lou Reed
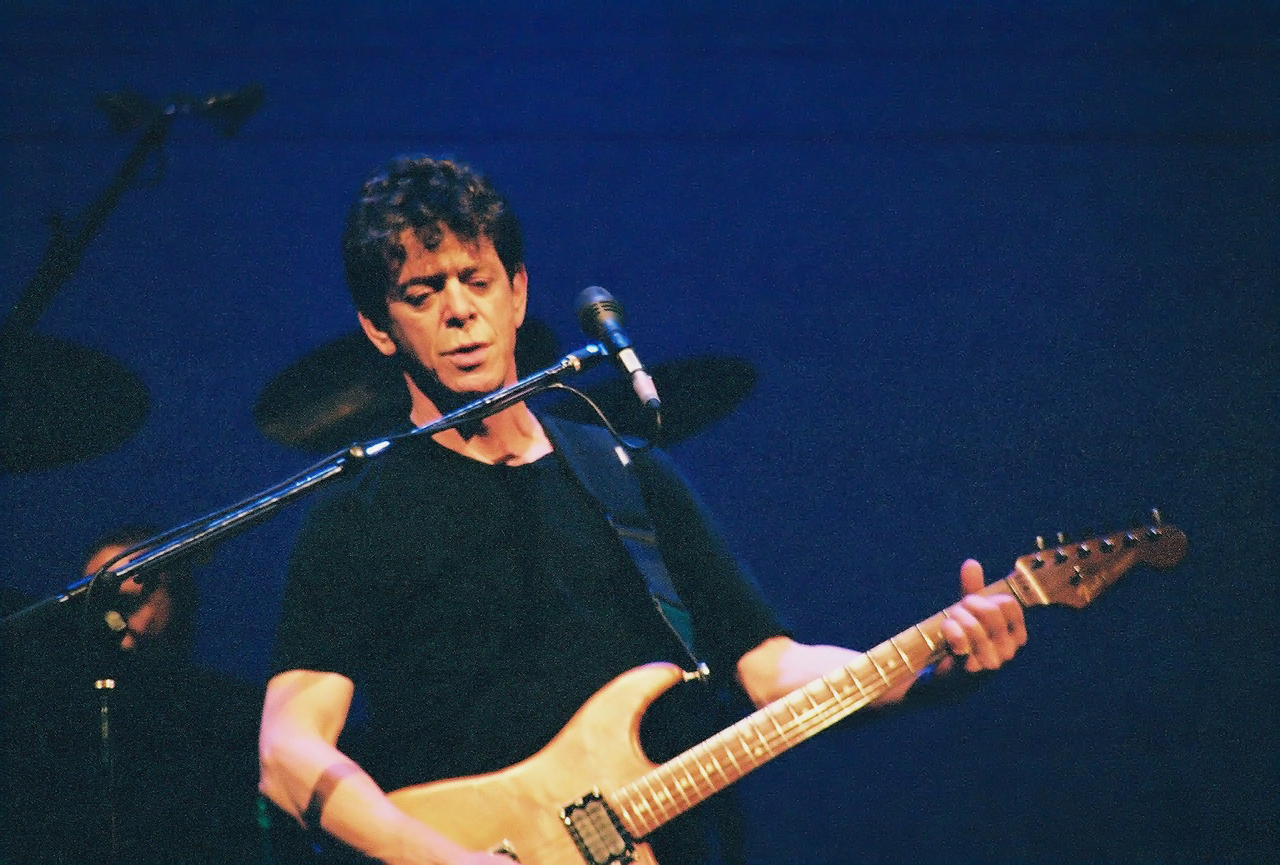
- Lou Reed played the ostrich tuning D-D-D-D-d-d on The Velvet Underground's "All Tomorrow’s Parties".

Regular tunings (semitones)
- Trivial (0)
- Minor thirds (3)
- Major thirds (4)
- All fourths (5)
- Augmented fourths (6)
- New standard (7, 3)
- All fifths (7)
- Minor sixths (8)

The ostrich guitar or ostrich tuning is a type of trivial tuning. It assigns one note to all strings, e.g. E-E-e-e-e'-e' or D-D-D-D-d'-d'. The term "ostrich guitar" was coined by Lou Reed after the pre-Velvet Underground song "The Ostrich" by Lou Reed and the Primitives, on which he first recorded using this tuning, the first known commercial composition to make use of a trivial guitar tuning.

== Musical theory ==
The trivial tuning is a regular tuning based on the unison musical interval, which has zero semitones. It assigns exactly one pitch class (for example D, A♯, F or B) to all guitar-strings, tuned to the same note over two or three octaves. This creates an intense, chorused drone, and interesting fingering potential. Among alternative tunings for the guitar, the trivial tuning is a regular and repetitive tuning. It is its own left-handed tuning.

== Example ==
To create a trivial D tuning from a standard guitar tuning:

  1d  ----- * downtuned to d (from e to d)
  2d  ----- * uptuned to d (from B to d)
  3D  ----- * downtuned to D (from G to D)
  4D  ----- * left at standard
  5D  ----- * downtuned to D (from A to D)
  6D  ----- * downtuned to D (from E to D)

== Origins ==
The term "ostrich guitar" was coined by Lou Reed in 1965 after the song "The Ostrich" by Lou Reed and the Primitives, on which he first used this tuning. John Cale, a collaborator with avant-garde composer La Monte Young, recognised the similarity between Reed's guitar tuning and Young's work involving drone music when he was hired to play Reed's song "The Ostrich" as part of a fabricated touring group.

Reed and Cale (who would play viola, keyboards and bass) began to collaborate and investigate the connections between ostrich tuning and drone music, as the band introduced new members (such as guitarist Sterling Morrison and percussionist Angus MacLise, another student of La Monte Young) and they became known as the Velvet Underground. Cale had composed and recorded Loop in 1964, but which became the first EP released under this band name, composed of drones played on an electric viola, and the combination of both Cale's viola and Reed's guitar tunings would be an early hallmark of their work. Reed used ostrich tunings on the 1967 album The Velvet Underground & Nico on the songs "Venus in Furs" (appearing at the end of the song) and "All Tomorrow's Parties", which also included Cale playing drones on viola.

According to an interview with drummer Moe Tucker in What Goes On?, Reed's ostrich guitar was a guitar that had its frets removed, and was stolen shortly after the album sessions.
