= Regular tuning =

Set of alternative guitar tunings

Regular tunings
- For regular guitar-tunings, the distance between consecutive open-strings is a constant musical-interval, measured by semitones on the chromatic circle. The chromatic circle lists the twelve notes of the octave.

Basic information
- Aliases: Uniform tunings All-interval tunings

Advanced information
- Advantages: Provides new material for improvisation by advanced guitarists
- Disadvantages: Makes it difficult to play music written for standard tuning.

Regular tunings (semitones)
- Trivial (0)
- Minor thirds (3)
- Major thirds (4)
- All fourths (5)
- Augmented fourths (6)
- New standard (7, 3)
- All fifths (7)
- Minor sixths (8)

Among alternative guitar-tunings, regular tunings have equal musical intervals between the paired notes of their successive open strings.

Guitar tunings assign pitches to the open strings of guitars. Tunings can be described by the particular pitches that are denoted by notes in Western music. By convention, the notes are ordered from lowest to highest. The standard tuning defines the string pitches as E, A, D, G, B, and E. Between the open-strings of the standard tuning are three perfect-fourths (E–A, A–D, D–G), then the major third G–B, and the fourth perfect-fourth B–E.

In contrast, regular tunings have constant intervals between their successive open-strings:

- 3 semitones (minor third): Minor-thirds, or Diminished tuning
- 4 semitones (major third): Major-thirds or Augmented tuning,
- 5 semitones (perfect fourth): All-fourths tuning,
- 6 semitones (augmented fourth, tritone, or diminished fifth): Augmented-fourths tuning,
- 7 semitones (perfect fifth): All-fifths tuning

For the regular tunings, chords may be moved diagonally around the fretboard, as well as vertically for the repetitive regular tunings (minor thirds, major thirds, and augmented fourths). Regular tunings thus often appeal to new guitarists and also to jazz-guitarists, as they facilitate key transpositions without requiring a completely new set of fingerings for the new key. On the other hand, some conventional major/minor system chords are easier to play in standard tuning than in regular tuning. Left-handed guitarists may use the chord charts from one class of regular tunings for its left-handed tuning; for example, the chord charts for all-fifths tuning may be used for guitars strung with left-handed all-fourths tuning.

The class of regular tunings has been named and described by Professor William Sethares. Sethares's 2001 chapter Regular tunings (in his revised 2010–2011 Alternate tuning guide) is the leading source for this article. This article's descriptions of particular regular-tunings use other sources also.

== Standard and alternative guitar-tunings: A review ==
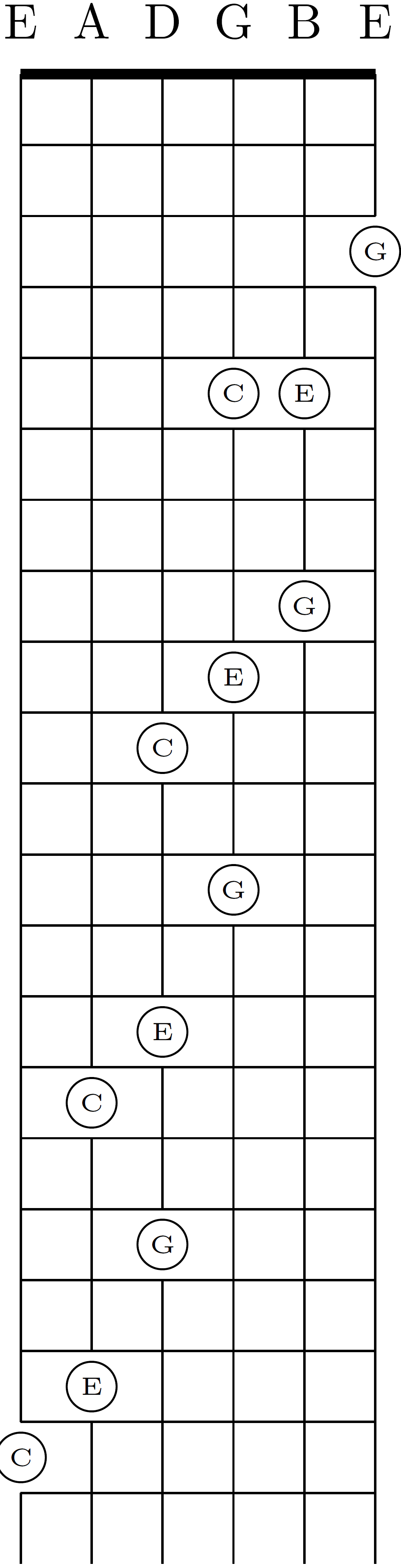
In standard tuning, the C-major chord has three shapes because of the irregular major-third between the G- and B-strings.

This summary of standard tuning also introduces the terms for discussing alternative tunings.

=== Standard ===
Standard tuning has the following open-string notes:

E2–A2–D3–G3–B3–E4.

In standard tuning, the separation of the second (B), and third (G) string is by a major-third interval, which has a width of four semitones.

Standard tuning	open	1st fret (index)	2nd fret (middle)	3rd fret (ring)	4th fret (little)
1st string	E4	F4	F♯4/G♭4	G4	G♯4/A♭4
2nd string	B3	C4	C♯4/D♭4	D4	D♯4/E♭4
3rd string	G3	G♯3/A♭3	A3	A♯3/B♭3	B3
4th string	D3	D♯3/E♭3	E3	F3	F♯3/G♭3
5th string	A2	A♯2/B♭2	B2	C3	C♯3/D♭3
6th string	E2	F2	F♯2/G♭2	G2	G♯2/A♭2
Chromatic note progression

The irregularity has a price. Chords cannot be shifted around the fretboard in the standard tuning E–A–D–G–B–E, which requires four chord-shapes for the major chords. There are separate chord-forms for chords having their root note on the third, fourth, fifth, and sixth strings.

=== Alternative ===
Alternative ("alternate") tuning refers to any open-string note-arrangement other than standard tuning. Such alternative tuning arrangements offer different chord voicing and sonorities. Alternative tunings necessarily change the chord shapes associated with standard tuning, which eases the playing of some, often "non-standard", chords at the cost of increasing the difficulty of some traditionally-voiced chords. As with other scordatura tuning, regular tunings may require re-stringing the guitar with different string gauges. For example, all-fifths tuning has been difficult to implement on conventional guitars, due to the extreme high pitch required from the top string. Even a common approximation to all-fifths tuning, new standard tuning, requires a special set of strings.

== Properties ==
In the standard guitar-tuning, one major-third interval is interjected amid four perfect-fourth intervals. In each regular tuning, all string successions have the same interval.

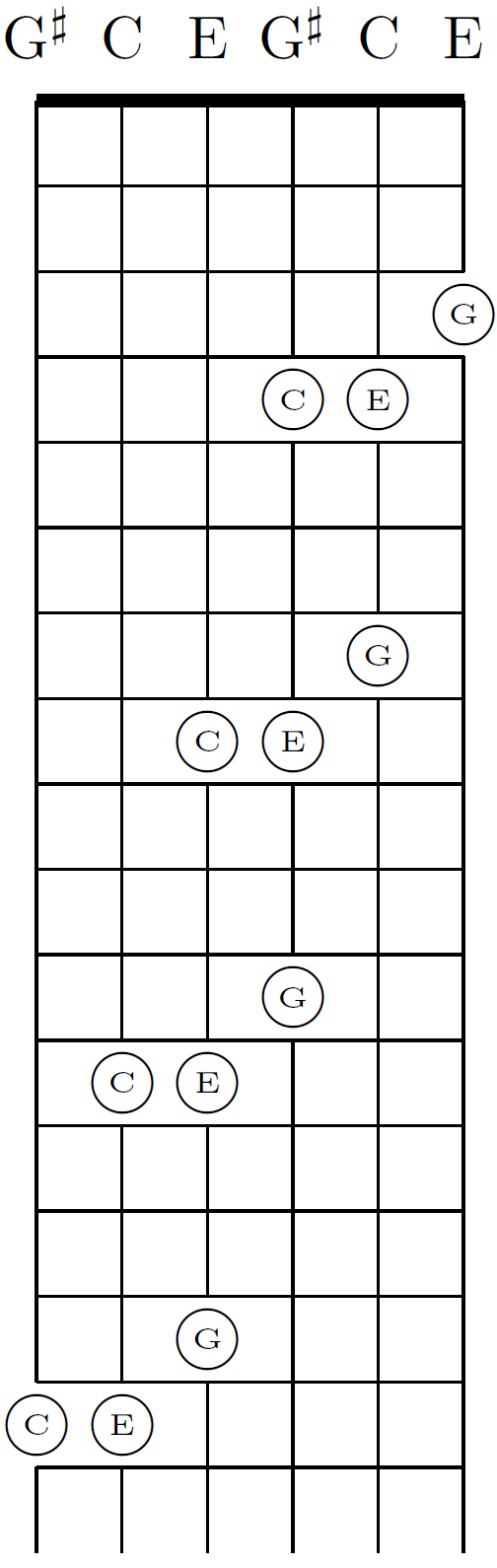
Chords can be shifted diagonally in regular tunings, such as major-thirds (M3) tuning.

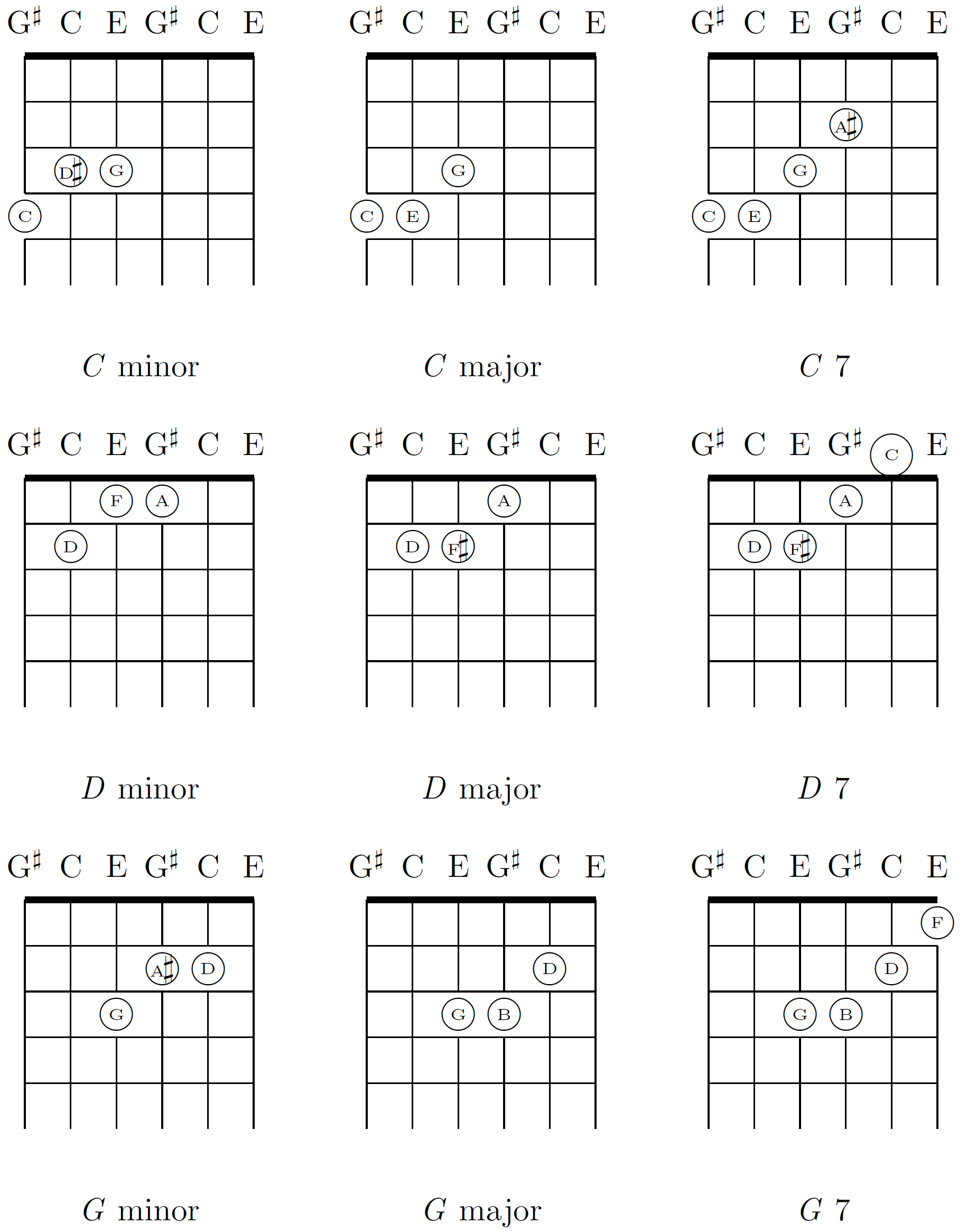
In regular tunings like M3 tuning, chords maintain the same shape, unlike the chords of standard tuning.

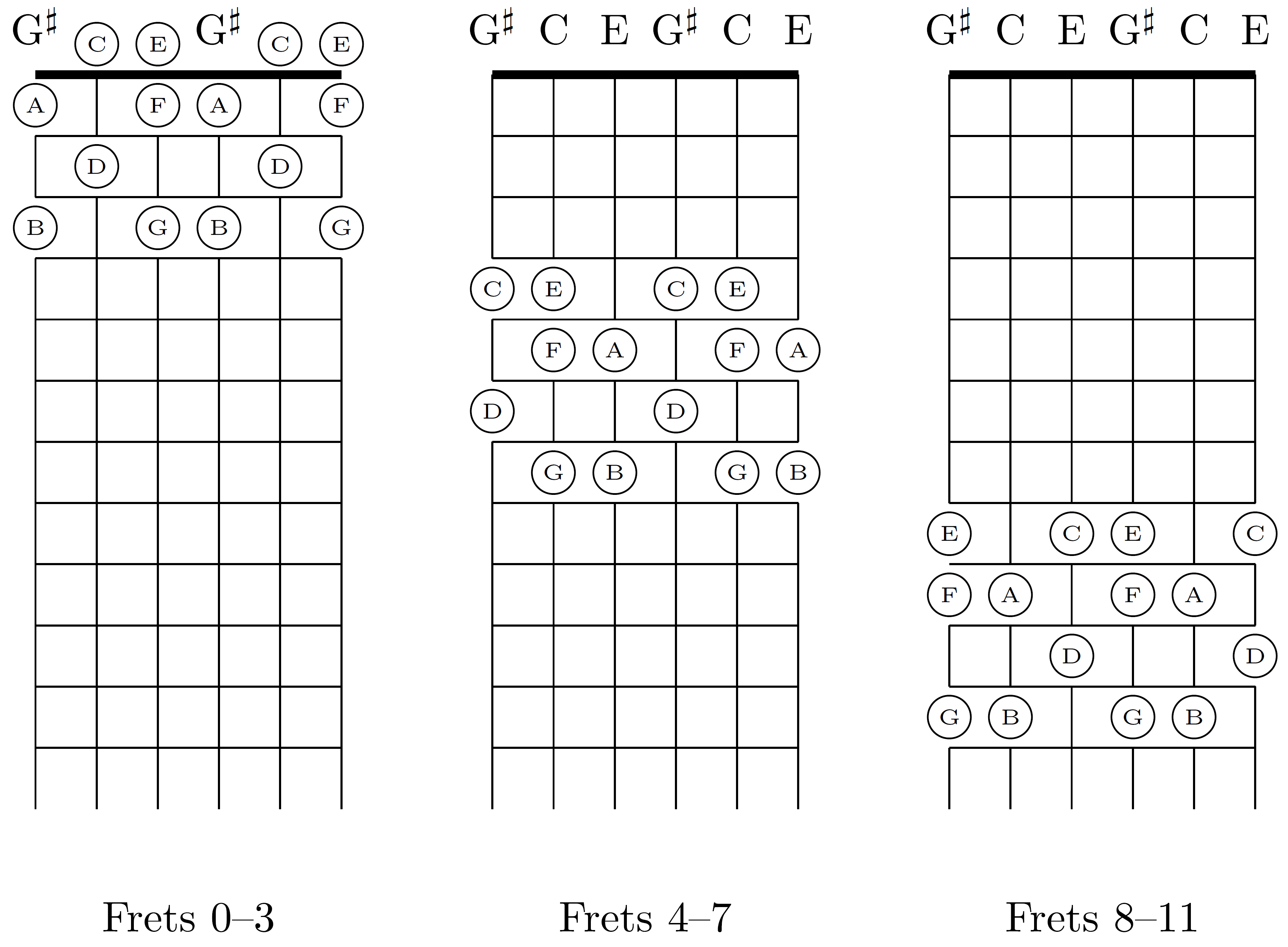
The fretboard of major-thirds tuning is segmented into four-fret intervals, which simplifies its learning and also reduces the need for shifting the left hand.

With standard tuning, and with all tunings, chord patterns can be moved twelve frets down, where the notes repeat in a higher octave.

For the standard tuning, there is exactly one interval of a third between the second and third strings, and all the other intervals are fourths. Working around the irregular third of standard tuning, guitarists have to memorize chord-patterns for at least three regions: The first four strings tuned in perfect fourths; two or more fourths and the third; and one or more initial fourths, the third, and the last fourth.

In contrast, regular tunings have constant intervals between their successive open-strings. In fact, the class of each regular tuning is characterized by its musical interval as shown by the following list:

- 3 semitones (minor third): Minor-thirds tuning,
- 4 semitones (major third): Major-thirds tuning,
- 5 semitones (perfect fourth): All-fourths tuning,
- 6 semitones (augmented fourth, tritone, or diminished fifth): Augmented-fourths tuning,
- 7 semitones (perfect fifth): All-fifths tuning

The regular tunings whose number of semitones s divides 12 (the number of notes in the octave) repeat their open-string notes (raised one octave) after 12/s strings: For example,

- having three semitones in its interval, minor-thirds tuning repeats its open notes after four (12/3) strings;
- having four semitones in its interval, major-thirds tuning repeats its open notes after three (12/4) strings;
- having six semitones in its interval, augmented-fourths tuning repeats its notes after two (12/6) strings.

Regular tunings have symmetrical scales all along the fretboard. This makes it simpler to translate chords into new keys. For the regular tunings, chords may be moved diagonally around the fretboard.

The shifting of chords is especially simple for the regular tunings that repeat their open strings, in which case chords can be moved vertically: Chords can be moved three strings up (or down) in major-thirds tuning, and chords can be moved two strings up (or down) in augmented-fourths tuning. Regular tunings thus appeal to new guitarists and also to jazz-guitarists, whose improvisation is simplified by regular intervals.

=== Particular conventional chords are more difficult to play ===
On the other hand, particular traditional chords may be more difficult to play in a regular tuning than in standard tuning. It can be difficult to play conventional chords especially in augmented-fourths tuning and all-fifths tuning, in which the wide (tritone and perfect-fifth) intervals require hand stretching. Some chords that are conventional in folk music are difficult to play even in all-fourths and major-thirds tunings, which do not require more hand-stretching than standard tuning. On the other hand, minor-thirds tuning features many barre chords with repeated notes, properties that appeal to beginners.

=== Frets covered by the hand ===
The chromatic scale climbs from one string to the next after a number of frets that is specific to each regular tuning. The chromatic scale climbs after exactly four frets in major-thirds tuning, so reducing the extensions of the little and index fingers ("hand stretching"). For other regular tunings, the successive strings have intervals that are minor thirds, perfect fourths, augmented fourths, or perfect fifths; thus, the fretting hand covers three, five, six, or seven frets respectively to play a chromatic scale. (Of course, the lowest chromatic-scale uses the open strings and so requires one less fret to be covered.)

== Examples ==
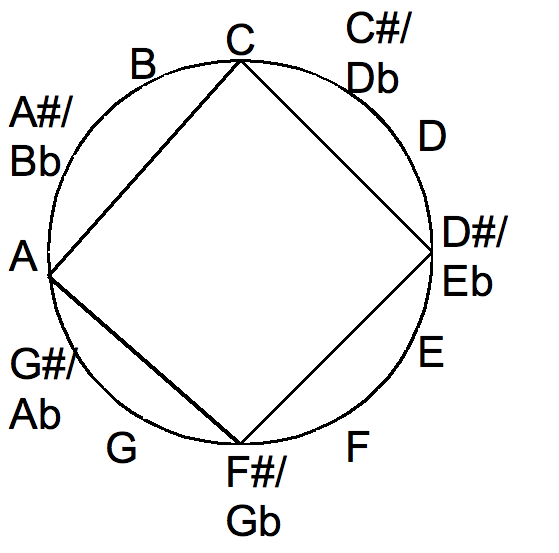
Every minor-thirds tuning repeats its open notes after four strings.

The following regular tunings are discussed by Sethares, who also mentions other regular tunings that are difficult to play or have had little musical interest, to date.

=== Minor thirds ===
C2–E♭2–G♭2–A2–C3–E♭3, or
B2–D3–F3–A♭3–B3–D4

In each minor-thirds (m3) tuning, every interval between successive strings is a minor third. Thus each repeats its open-notes after four strings. In the minor-thirds tuning beginning with C, the open strings contain the notes (C, E♭, Gb) of the diminished C triad.

Minor-thirds tuning features many barre chords with repeated notes, properties that appeal to acoustic guitarists and to beginners. Doubled notes have different sounds because of differing "string widths, tensions and tunings, and [they] reinforce each other, like the doubled strings of a twelve string guitar add chorusing and depth," according to William Sethares.

Achieving the same range as a standard-tuned guitar using minor-thirds tuning would require a nine-string guitar (e.g. E♭2–G♭2–A2–C3–E♭3–G♭3–A3–C4–E♭4).

=== Major thirds ===
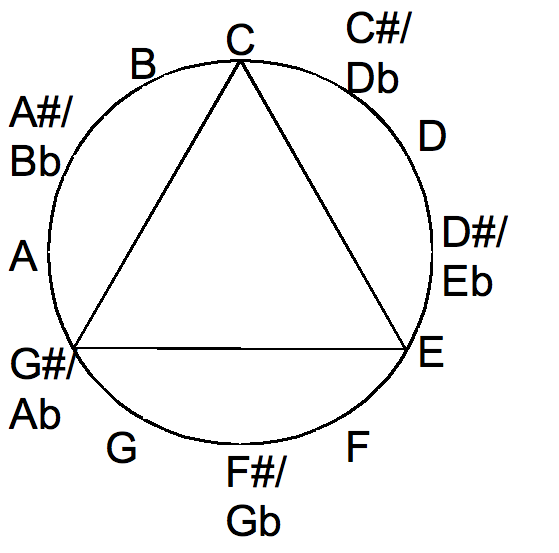
The major-thirds tuning A♭2–C3–E3–A♭3–C4–E5 repeats its three open-notes in the higher octave after three strings.

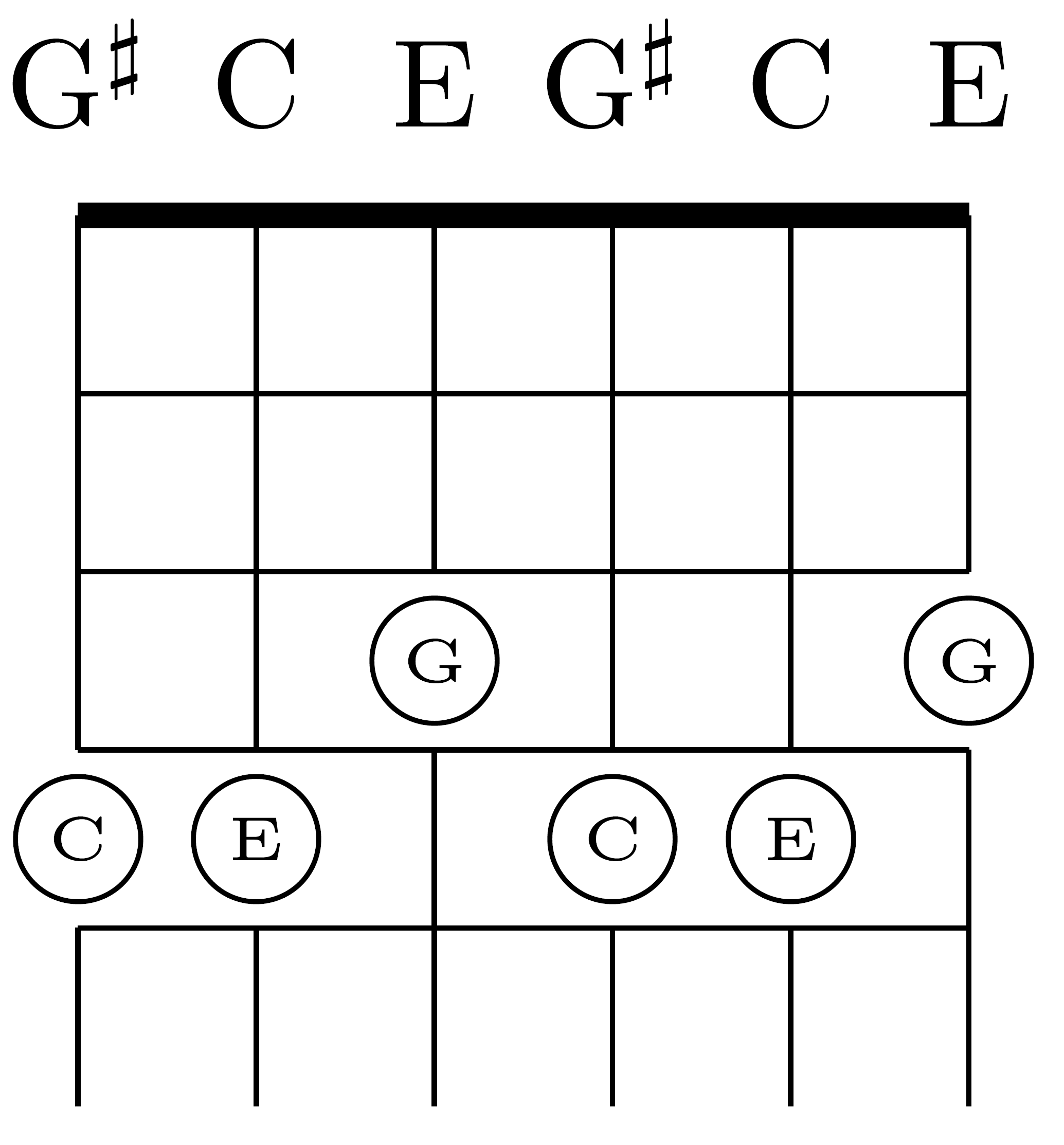
Chords vertically shift.

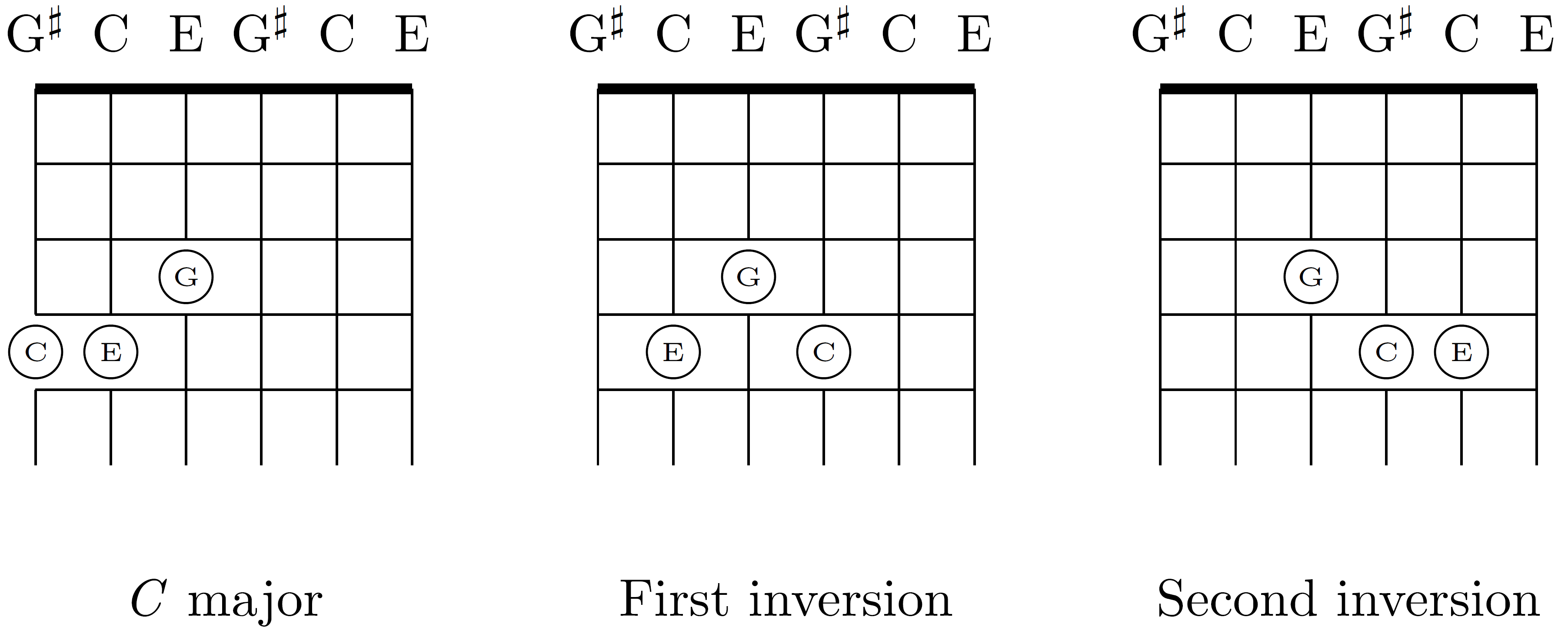
In major-thirds tuning, chords are inverted by raising notes by three strings on the same frets. The inversions of a C major chord are shown.

Major-thirds tuning repeats its notes after three strings.

Major-thirds tuning is a regular tuning in which the musical intervals between successive strings are each major thirds. Like minor-thirds tuning (and unlike all-fourths and all-fifths tuning), major-thirds tuning is a repetitive tuning; it repeats its octave after three strings, which again simplifies the learning of chords and improvisation; similarly, minor-thirds tuning repeats itself after four strings while augmented-fourths tuning repeats itself after two strings.

Neighboring the standard tuning is the all-thirds tuning that has the open strings

E2–G♯2–B♯2–E3–G♯3–B♯3 (or F♭2–A♭2–C3–F♭3–A♭3–C4).

With six strings, major-thirds tuning has a smaller range than standard tuning; with seven strings, the major-thirds tuning covers the range of standard tuning on six strings. With the repetition of three open-string notes, each major-thirds tuning provides the guitarist with many options for fingering chords. Indeed, the fingering of two successive frets suffices to play pure major and minor chords, while the fingering of three successive frets suffices to play seconds, fourths, sevenths, and ninths.

For the standard Western guitar, which has six strings, major-thirds tuning has a smaller range than standard tuning; on a guitar with seven strings, the major-thirds tuning covers the range of standard tuning on six strings. Even greater range is possible with guitars with eight strings.

Major-thirds tuning was heavily used in 1964 by the American jazz-guitarist Ralph Patt to facilitate his style of improvisation.

=== All fourths ===
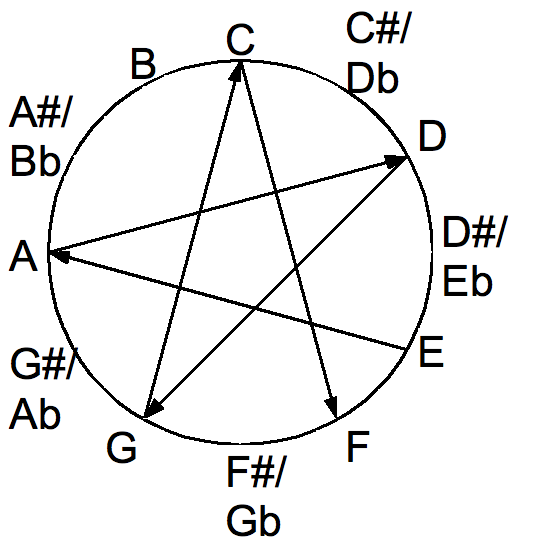
The consecutive notes of all-fourths tuning are spaced apart by five semi-tones on the chromatic circle.

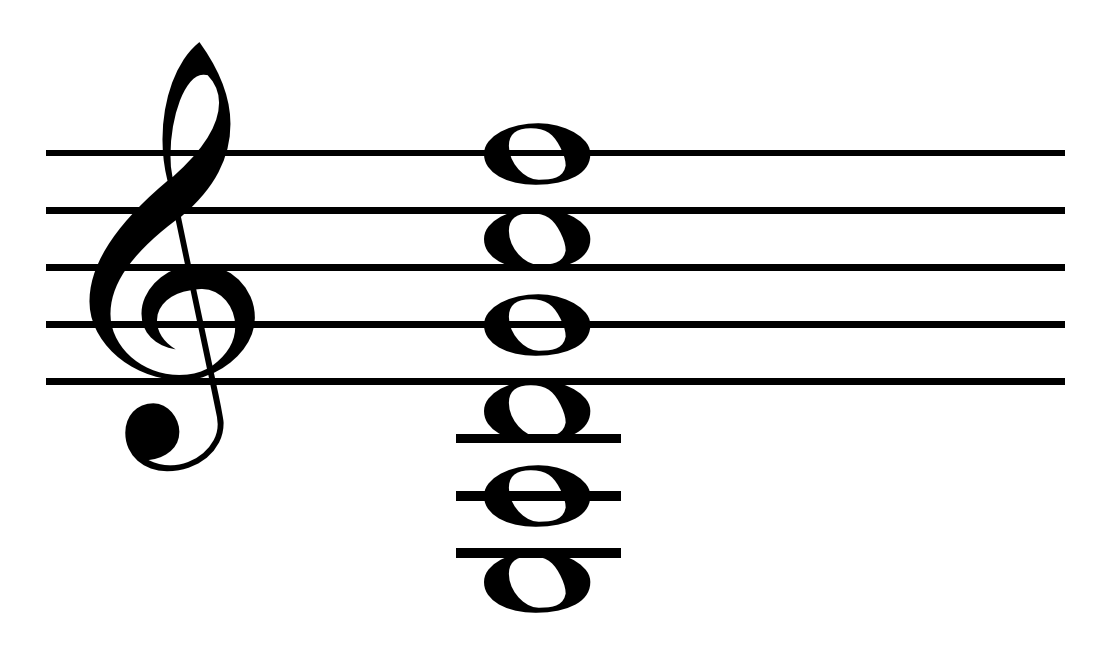
All fourths tuning.

E2–A2–D3–G3–C4–F4

This tuning is like that of the lowest four strings in standard tuning. Consequently, of all the regular tunings, it is the closest approximation to standard tuning, and thus it best allows the transfer of a knowledge of chords from standard tuning to a regular tuning. Jazz musician Stanley Jordan plays guitar in all-fourths tuning; he has stated that all-fourths tuning "simplifies the fingerboard, making it logical".

For all-fourths tuning, all twelve major chords (in the first or open positions) are generated by two chords, the open F major chord and the D major chord. The regularity of chord-patterns reduces the number of finger positions that need to be memorized.

The left-handed involute of an all-fourths tuning is an all-fifths tuning. All-fourths tuning is based on the perfect fourth (five semitones), and all-fifths tuning is based on the perfect fifth (seven semitones). Consequently, chord charts for all-fifths tunings may be used for left-handed all-fourths tuning.

=== Augmented fourths ===
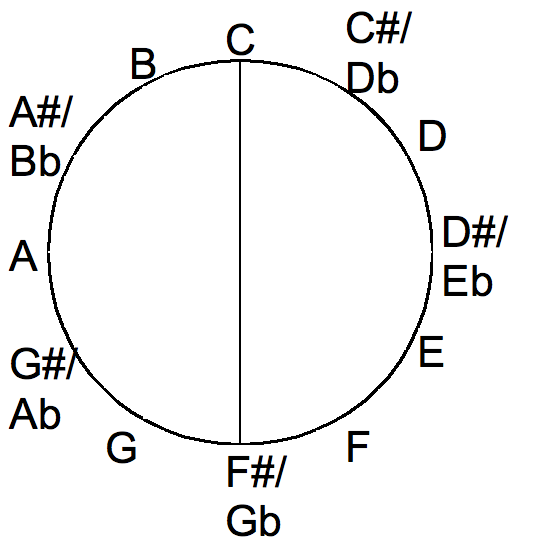
A line segment bisecting the chromatic circle specifies an augmented-fourths (tritone) tuning.

C2–F♯2–C3–F♯3–C4–F♯4 and B1–F1–B2–F3–B3–F4 etc.

Between the all-fifths and all-fourths tunings are augmented-fourth tunings, which are also called "diminished-fifths" or "tritone" tunings. It is a repetitive tuning that repeats its notes after two strings. With augmented-fourths tunings, the fretboard has greatest symmetry. In fact, every augmented-fourths tuning lists the notes of all the other augmented-fourths tunings on the frets of its fretboard. Professor Sethares wrote that

"The augmented-fourth interval is the only interval whose inverse is the same as itself. The augmented-fourths tuning is the only tuning (other than the 'trivial' tuning C–C–C–C–C–C) for which all chords-forms remain unchanged when the strings are reversed. Thus the augmented-fourths tuning is its own 'lefty' tuning."

Of all the augmented-fourths tunings, the C2–F♯2–C3–F♯3–C4–F♯4 tuning is the closest approximation to the standard tuning, and its fretboard is displayed next:

Tritone: Each fret displays the open strings of an augmented-fourths tuning
	open (0th fret)	1st fret	2nd fret	3rd fret	4th fret	5th fret
1st string	F#4	G4	G#4	A4	A#4	B4
2nd string	C4	C#4	D4	D#4	E4	F4
3rd string	F#3	G3	G#3	A3	A#3	B3
4th string	C3	C#3	D3	D#3	E3	F3
5th string	F#2	G2	G#2	A2	A#2	B2
6th string	C2	C#2	D2	D#2	E2	F2

An augmented-fourths tuning "makes it very easy for playing half-whole scales, diminished 7 licks, and whole tone scales," stated guitarist Ron Jarzombek.

=== All fifths: "Mandoguitar" ===
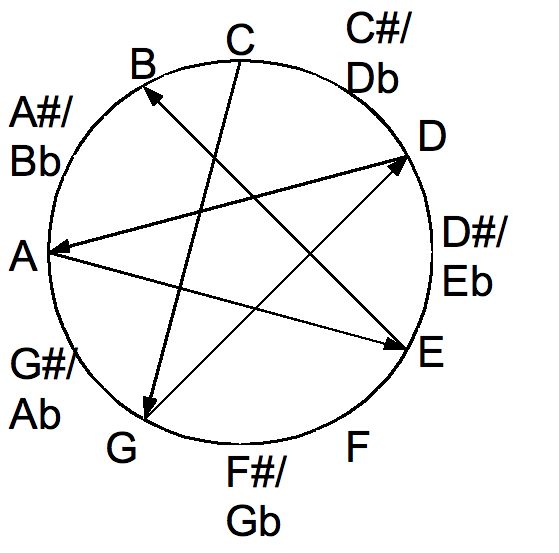
The consecutive open-notes of all-fifths tuning are spaced seven semi-tones apart on the chromatic circle. While the notes of the open-notes of the all-fifths and all-fourths tunings agree, their orderings are reversed.

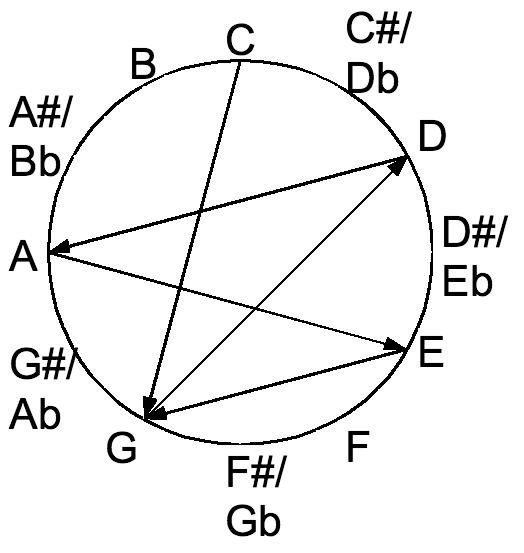
New standard tuning substitutes a G for the high B of all-fifths tuning

C2–G2–D3–A3–E4–B4

All-fifths tuning is a tuning in intervals of perfect fifths like that of a mandolin, cello or violin; other names include "perfect fifths" and "fifths". Consequently, classical compositions written for violin or guitar may be adapted to all-fifths tuning more easily than to standard tuning.

When he was asked whether tuning in fifths facilitates "new intervals or harmonies that aren't readily available in standard tuning", Robert Fripp responded, "It's a more rational system, but it's also better sounding—better for chords, better for single notes." To build chords, Fripp uses "perfect intervals in fourths, fifths and octaves", so avoiding minor thirds and especially major thirds, which are sharp in equal temperament tuning (in comparison to thirds in just intonation). It is a challenge to adapt conventional guitar-chords to new standard tuning, which is based on all-fifths tuning. Some closely voiced jazz chords become impractical in NST and all-fifths tuning.

It has a wide range, thus its implementation can be difficult. The high B4 requires a taut, thin string, and consequently is prone to breaking. This can be ameliorated by using a shorter scale length guitar, by shifting to a different key, or by shifting down a fifth. All-fifths tuning was used by the jazz-guitarist Carl Kress.

The left-handed involute of an all-fifths tuning is an all-fourths tuning. All-fifths tuning is based on the perfect fifth (seven semitones), and all-fourths tuning is based on the perfect fourth (five semitones). Consequently, chord charts for all-fifths tunings are used for left-handed all-fourths tuning.

All-fifths tuning has been approximated with tunings in the Through The Looking Glass Guitar of Kei Nakano, which has been played by him since 2015. This new tuning is like a mirror to all kinds of string instruments including guitar. Also it can adapt to any other tunings of guitar. If tuned to usual conventional guitar for the right handed person, it is able to use for lefty guitar in general, and vice versa.

==== New standard tuning ====
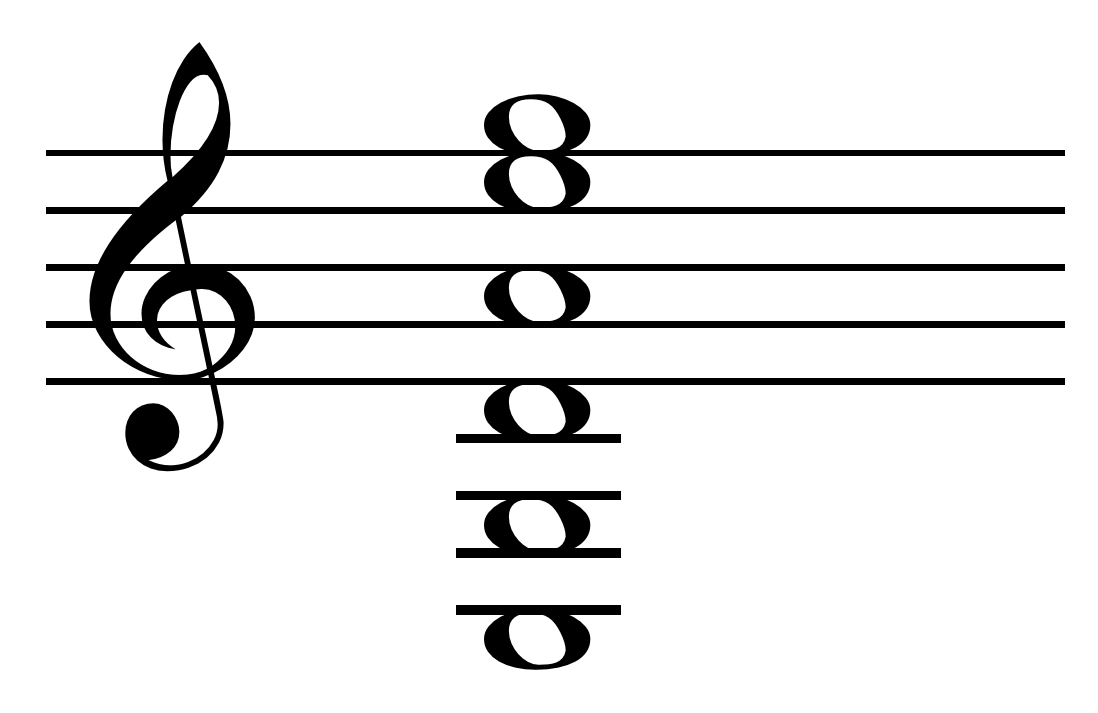
New standard tuning.

New Standard Tuning's open strings.

All-fifths tuning has been approximated with tunings that avoid the high B4 or the low C2. The B4 has been replaced with a G4 in the new standard tuning (NST) of King Crimson's Robert Fripp. The original version of NST was all-fifths tuning. However, in the 1980s, Fripp never attained the all fifth's high B4. While he could attain A4, the string's life-time distribution was too short. Experimenting with a g string, Fripp succeeded. "Originally, seen in 5ths. all the way, the top string would not go to B. so, as on a tenor banjo, I adopted an A on the first string. These kept breaking, so G was adopted." In 2012, Fripp experimented with A String (0.007); if successful, the experiment could lead to "the NST 1.2", CGDAE-A, according to Fripp. Fripp's NST has been taught in Guitar Craft courses. Guitar Craft and its successor Guitar Circle have taught Fripp's tuning to three-thousand students.

=== Extreme intervals ===
For regular tunings, intervals wider than a perfect fifth or narrower than a minor third have, thus far, had limited interest.

==== Wide intervals ====
Two regular-tunings based on sixths, having intervals of minor sixths (eight semitones) and of major sixths (nine semitones), have received scholarly discussion. The chord charts for minor-sixths tuning are useful for left-handed guitarists playing in major-thirds tuning; the chord charts for major-sixths tuning, for left-handed guitarists playing in minor-thirds tuning.

The regular tunings with minor-seventh (ten semitones) or major-seventh (eleven semitones) intervals would make conventional major/minor chord-playing very difficult, as would octave intervals.

==== Narrow intervals ====
There are regular-tunings that have as their intervals either zero semi-tones (unison), one semi-tone (minor second), or two semi-tones (major second). These tunings tend to increase the difficulty in playing the major/minor system chords of conventionally tuned guitars.

The "trivial" class of unison tunings (such as C3–C3–C3–C3–C3–C3) are each their own left-handed tuning. Unison tunings are briefly discussed in the article on ostrich tunings. Having exactly one note, unison tunings are also ostrich tunings, which have exactly one pitch class (but may have two or more octaves, for example, E2, E3, and E4'); non-unison ostrich tunings are not regular.

== Left-handed involution ==
The class of regular tunings is preserved under the involution from right-handed to left-handed tunings, as observed by William Sethares. The present discussion of left-handed tunings is of interest to musical theorists, mathematicians, and left-handed persons, but may be skipped by other readers.

For left-handed guitars, the ordering of the strings reverses the ordering of the strings for right-handed guitars. For example, the left-handed involute of the standard tuning E–A–D–G–B–E is the "lefty" tuning E–B–G–D–A–E. Similarly, the "left-handed" involute of the "lefty" tuning is the standard ("righty") tuning.

The reordering of open-strings in left-handed tunings has an important consequence. The chord fingerings for the right-handed tunings must be changed for left-handed tunings. However, the left-handed involute of a regular tuning is easily recognized: it is another regular tuning. Thus the chords for the involuted regular-tuning may be used for the left-handed involute of a regular tuning.

For example, the right-handed version of all-fourths tuning is all-fifths tuning, and the left-handed version of all-fifths tuning is all-fourths tuning. In general, the left-handed involute of the regular tuning based on the interval with $n$ semitones is the regular tuning based on its involuted interval with $12-n$ semitones: All-fourths tuning is based on the perfect fourth (five semitones), and all-fifths tuning is based on the perfect fifth (seven semitones), as mentioned previously. The following table summarizes the lefty-righty pairings discussed by Sethares.

Left-handed tunings
Right-handed	Left-handed
Minor thirds	Major sixths
Major thirds	Minor sixths
All fourths	All fifths
Augmented fourths	Diminished fifths
All fifths	All fourths
Minor sixths	Major thirds
Major sixths	Minor thirds

The left-handed involute of a left-handed involute is the original right-handed tuning. The left-handed version of the trivial tuning C–C–C–C–C–C is also C–C–C–C–C–C. Among non-trivial tunings, only the class of augmented-fourths tunings is fixed under the lefty involution.

== Summary ==
The principal regular-tunings have their properties summarized in the following table:

Regular tuning	Interval (Number of semitones)	Repetition	Advantages: Each facilitates learning and improvisation.	Disadvantages: None use standard-tuning's open chords.	Left-handed involution	Guitarist(s)
Major thirds	Major third (4)	After 3 strings	Chromatic scale on four successive frets.; Hence, reduced hand-stretching: Major and minor chords are played on 2 successive frets; others (seconds, fourths, sevenths, and ninths) on 3.	Smaller range (without 7 strings); Only three open-notes.	Minor-sixth tuning	Ralph Patt
All fourths	Perfect fourth (5)	Non-repetitive	Uses chords from lowest 4 strings of standard tuning.; Same tuning as bass guitar	Difficult to play folk chords	All-fifths tuning	Stanley Jordan
Augmented fourths	Tritone (6)	After 2 strings	symmetry ("left-handed")	Only 2 open notes	Augmented-fourths tuning	Shawn Lane
All fifths	Perfect fifth (7)	Non-repetitive	Wide scope facilitates ensemble playing and single-note picking (rather than conventional chords); Natural for all-fifths music (violin, cello, mandolin)	Very difficult to play conventional chord-voicings.; Requires extreme (light and heavy) strings.	All-fourths tuning	Carl Kress; Kei Nakano
