= Carl Kress =

American jazz guitarist (1907–1965)

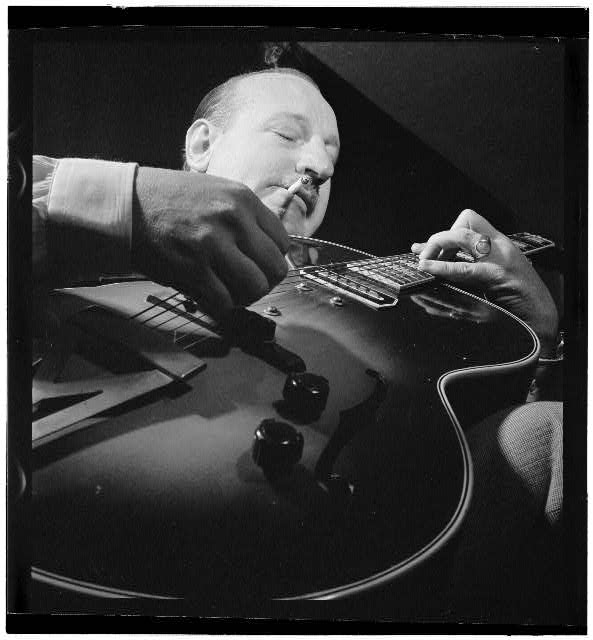
- Kress, c. June 1947

Background information
- Born: October 20, 1907; Newark, New Jersey, U.S.
- Died: June 10, 1965 Reno, Nevada, U.S.
- Genre: Jazz
- Occupation: Musician
- Instrument: Guitar
- Years active: 1926–1965
- Formerly of: The Paul Whiteman Orchestra

Carl Kress (October 20, 1907 – June 10, 1965) was an American jazz guitarist.

== Music career ==
Kress started on piano before picking up the banjo. Beginning in 1926, he played guitar during his brief period in Paul Whiteman's orchestra. For most of his career, he was a studio musician and sideman buried in large orchestras, and his name was little known. His work in the 1920s and 1930s included sessions with The Boswell Sisters, The Dorsey Brothers, Bix Beiderbecke, Hoagy Carmichael, Miff Mole, Red Nichols, Adrian Rollini, and Frankie Trumbauer.

Outside of orchestras, Kress played in several guitar duets with Eddie Lang (1932), Dick McDonough (1934, 1937), Tony Mottola (1941), and George Barnes (1961–1965). In 1938 and 1939, he made some solo recordings, the songs "Peg Leg Shuffle", "Helena", "Love Song", "Sutton Mutton", and "Afterthoughts". During the 1940s, he played Dixieland jazz with Bobby Hackett, Pee Wee Russell, and Muggsy Spanier.

Kress was married to Helen Carroll, a native of Bloomington, Indiana, who moved to New York City to become a singer. She was a member of the Satisfiers and sang with Perry Como, Frank Sinatra, and Jo Stafford. Carl and Helen Kress lived in Manhasset, New York. Carl Kress died of a heart attack in 1965 while he was on tour with George Barnes (musician) in Reno, Nevada.

== Technique ==
Like many early jazz guitarists, Kress played banjo before switching to guitar. The tenor banjo tunes its consecutive strings in intervals of fifths,

C-G-D-A,

and Kress adapted this all-fifths tuning for his guitar

B♭-F-C-G-D-A,

although he down-tuned the A-string an octave.

Before switching to fifths tuning, Kress used other tunings on the banjo and tenor guitar. His fifths-tuning gave Kress's playing "fuller chords and basslines", according to Richard Lieberson.Lieberson (1996, p. 42) When Kress's duets with Dick McDonough were published, they were transposed from his fifths tuning to standard tuning.

All-fifths tuning is used by other instruments besides tenor banjos. For example, it is used by mandolins, violins, mandolas, violas, mandocellos, and cellos.

== Discography ==
=== As leader ===
- 1934-37 - The Guitar Genius of Dick McDonough & Carl Kress in the Thirties (Jazz Archives, 1976)
- 1934-37 - Pioneers of the Jazz Guitar (Yazoo, 1992) (Karl Cress only in four tracks)
- 1939.02 - Original Guitar Solos (Decca, 1940)
- 1941 - Fun on the Frets (Yazoo, ?) w Tony Mottola - Transcriptions
- 1961 - Guitar Galaxies (Mercury, 1962) (under George Barnes name)
- 1962 - Something Tender with George Barnes (United Artists, 1963)
- 1962 - Two Guitars Volume 1 with George Barnes (Stash, 1983)
- 1962 - Two Guitars and a Horn Volume II (Stash, 1983) with George Barnes under Bud Freeman name
- 1963.04 - Town Hall Concert with George Barnes (United Artists, 1963)
- 196?- Guitars, Anyone? Why Not Start at the Top? with George Barnes (Carney, 1963)

=== As sideman ===
- Louis Armstrong, Satchmo in Style (1959)
- Bix Beiderbecke, The Bix Beiderbecke Story Volume 2: Bix and Tram (Columbia, 1952)
- Erskine Butterfield, Just for Kicks (Livingston, 1955)
- Helen Caroll, Singin' & Swingin' (Stere-O-Craft, 1958)
- Bob Crosby, South Pacific Blows Warm (1958)
- Jimmy Dorsey, Dixie by Dorsey (1950)
- Jimmy McPartland, Shades of Bix (Brunswick, 1953)
- Red Nichols, Rhythm of the Day (1983)
- Jack Teagarden, Jazz Great (Bethlehem, 1955)
- Jack Teagarden/Maxine Sullivan, My Memories of You (Everest, 1956)
