= Repetitive tuning =

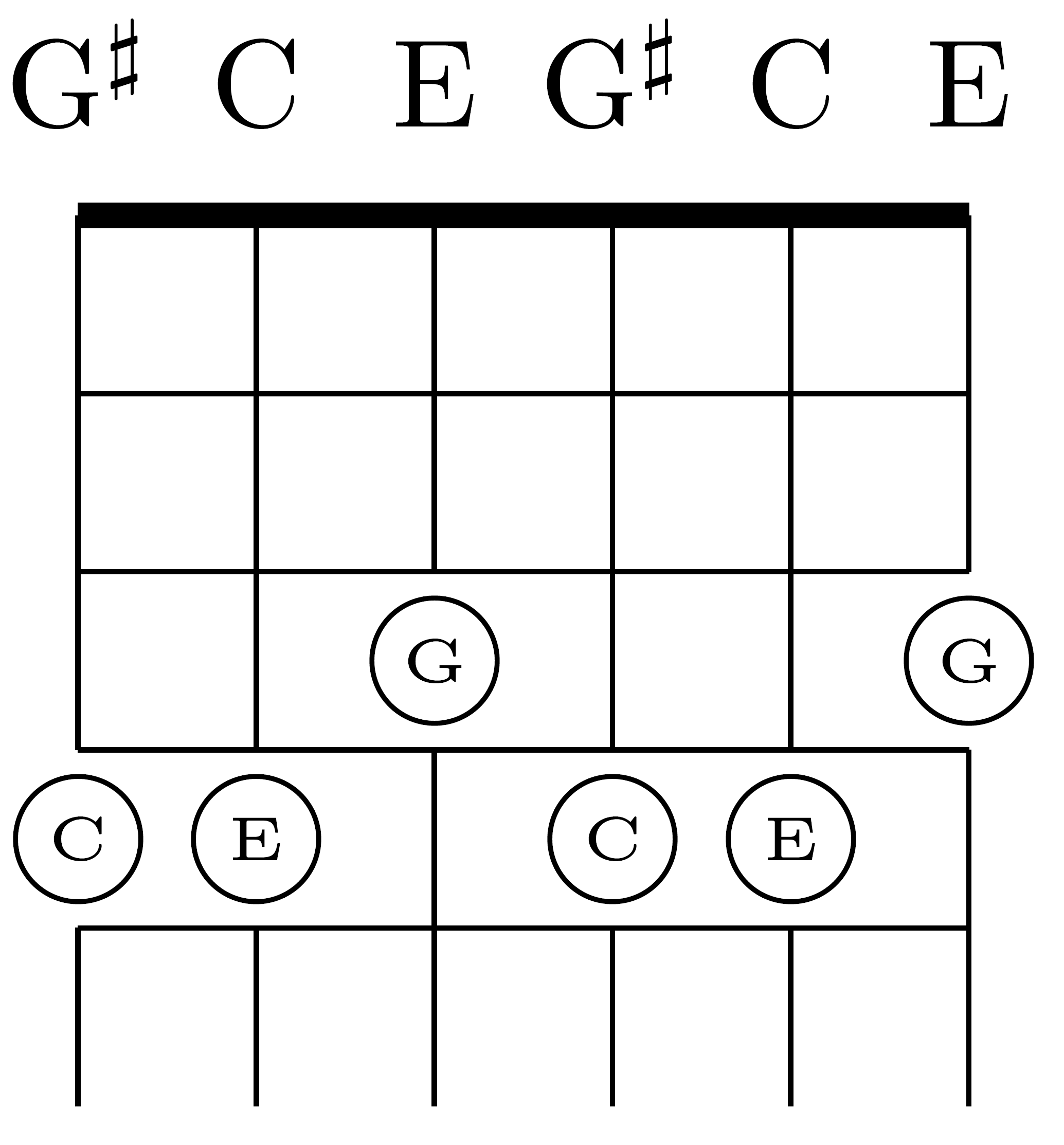
Major-thirds tuning repeats itself (at a higher octave) after three strings. Thus, chords can be shifted vertically on the same frets.

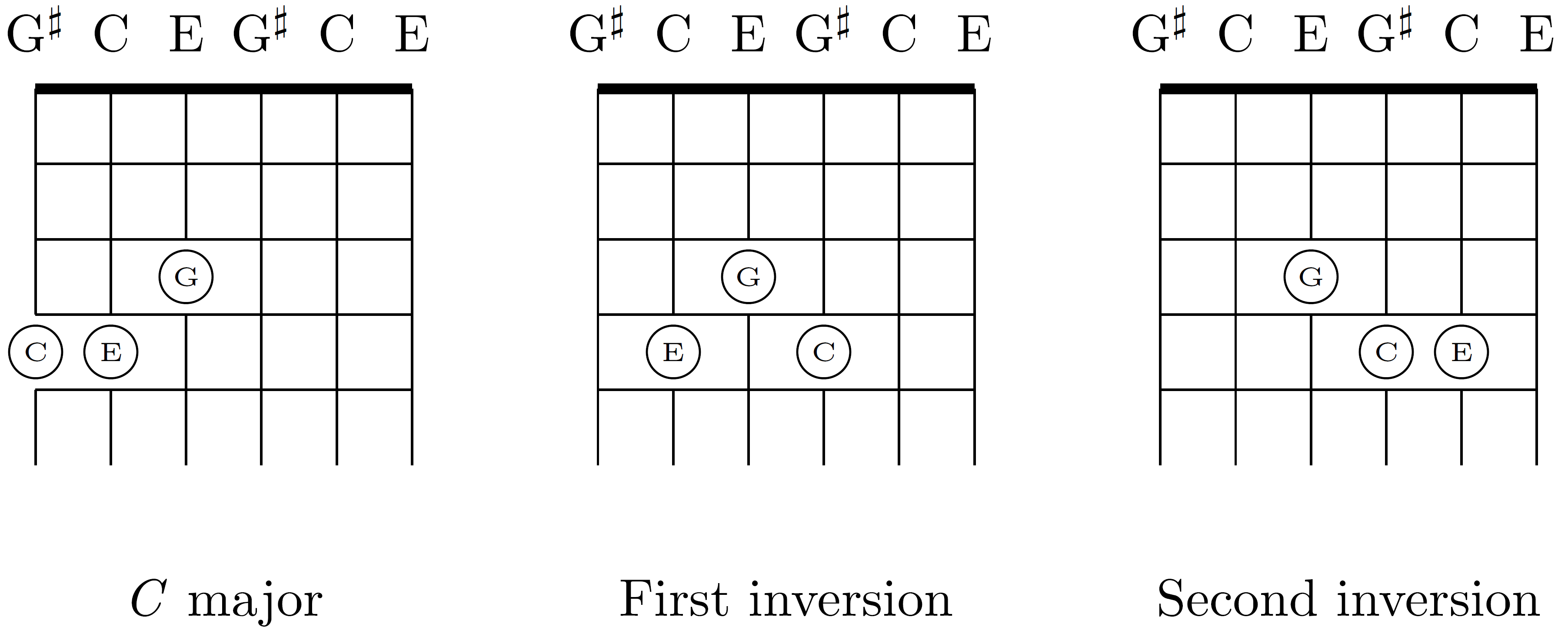
Chords are inverted by shifting notes by three strings on the same fret in major-thirds tuning.

Repetitive tunings are a type of alternative tunings for the guitar. A repetitive tuning begins with a list of notes that is duplicated, either at unison or at higher octaves.

Among regular tunings, there are four repetitive-tunings (besides trivially repetitive tunings such as C-C-C-C-C-C); this article discusses three minor-thirds tuning, major-thirds tuning, and augmented-fourths tuning (but not major seconds tuning, which is not repetitive on six strings). Among open tunings, there are repetitive versions of open C tuning and open G tuning, which have been associated with the English and Russian guitars, respectively.

Repetition eases the learning of fretboard and chords and eases improvisation. For example, in major-thirds tuning, chords are raised an octave by shifting fingers by three strings on the same frets.

Repetitive tunings are listed after their number of open pitches. For example, the repetitive open-C tuning C-E-G-C-E-G has three open-pitches, each of which is associated with repeated notes {(C,C), (E,E), (G,G)}.

== One ==
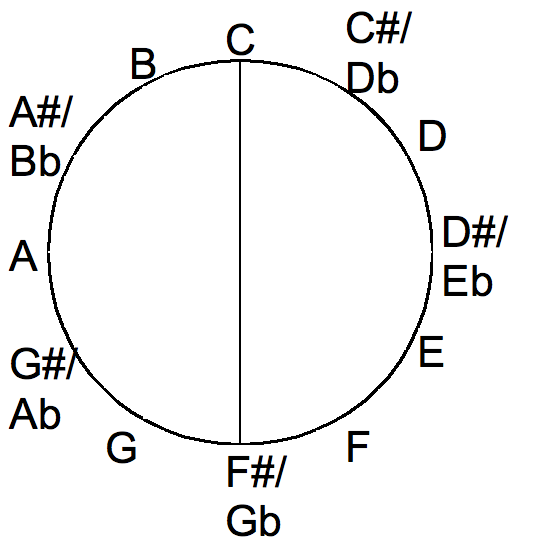
Every augmented-fourths (tritone) tunings repeats its two notes three times.

The trivial tuning repeats the same note every string. It is also called a unison regular tuning.

C-C-C-C-C-C.

Other trivial tunings repeat their single note in different octaves. For example:

C-C-c-c-c'-c'.

== Two ==
The following tunings repeat their notes on a higher octave after two strings:

- Augmented-fourths tuning, for example, B-F-b-f-b'-f'.

Any note fingered on one string can be fingered on two other strings. Thus chords can be fingered in many ways in augmented-fourths tuning. It is also a regular tuning in which the interval between its strings is a tritone (augmented fourth).

- A cittern tuning, such as C-G-c-g-c'-g'.

There are other tunings for the cittern.

- Alternating fourths and fifths tuning, such as A1-D2-A2-D3-A3-D4. (ADADAD)

This kind of tuning can also be called modal D or open D5 as it contains a D chord without a third. It is also used on other instruments, e.g. fiddle, mandolin and the Irish bouzouki.

== Three ==
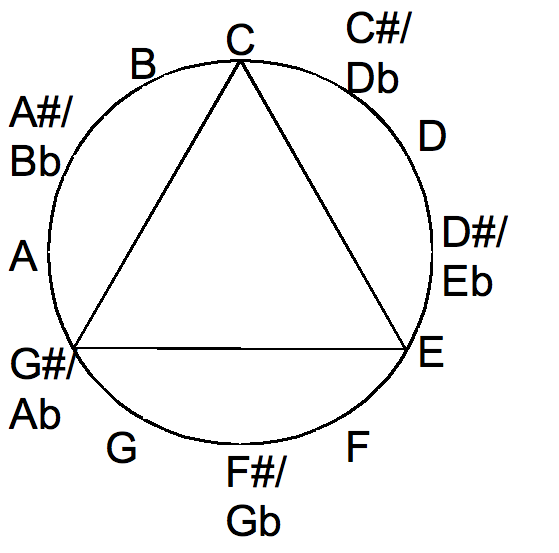
Every major-thirds tuning repeats its three notes twice.

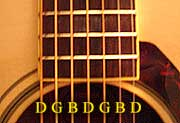
For the Russian guitar, the open strings form a G-major chord, which is twice repeated

The following tunings repeat their notes after three strings:

- Major-thirds tuning, such as E-G♯-c-e-g♯-c' and

D♯-G-B-D♯-G-B-D♯,

Chord inversion is especially simple in major-thirds tuning. Chords are inverted simply by raising one or two notes three strings. The raised notes are played with the same finger as the original notes. The major-thirds tuning is also a regular tuning having a major third interval between strings.

- Open G tuning, which is used as D', G', B, D, g, b, d' for the (7-string) Russian guitar.
- Open C tuning. For the English guitar's open C tuning, there are ten strings—of which the highest eight are paired in four courses (duplicated strings), C E GG cc ee gg.

== Four ==
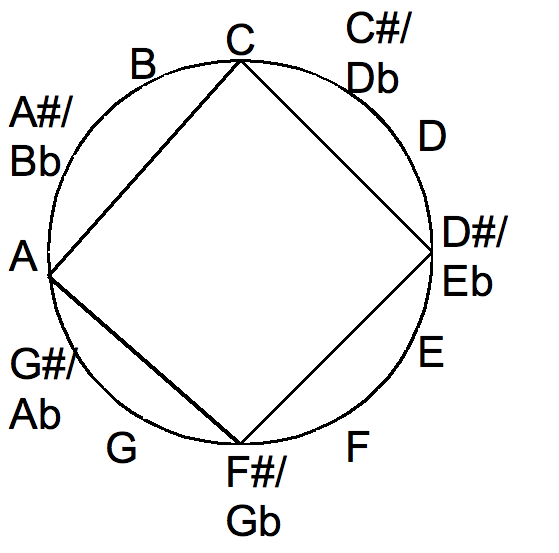
Minor-thirds tunings repeat its four notes after four strings (twice on an eight-string guitar).

In each minor-thirds tuning, every interval between successive strings is a minor third. It repeats its open-notes after four strings. Doubled notes have different sounds because of differing "string widths, tensions and tunings, and [they] reinforce each other, like the doubled strings of a twelve string guitar add chorusing and depth," according to William Sethares.

In the minor-thirds tuning beginning with C,

C-D♯-F♯-a-c-d♯

the open strings contain the notes (c, d♯, f♯) of the diminished C chord. The minor-thirds tuning is also a regular tuning, which has a minor third interval between consecutive strings.

== See also ==
- Scordatura, alternative tunings of stringed instruments
- Stringed instrument tunings
