= Stopped note =

Note type played on string instruments

On string instruments, a stopped note is a note whose pitch has been altered from the pitch of the open string by the player's left hand pressing (stopping) the string against the fingerboard.

== Bowed strings ==
Violin First Position Fingerings

On bowed string instruments, a stopped note is a played note that is fingered with the left hand, i.e. not an open string. This assists with tone production, the addition of vibrato, and sometimes additional volume but creates difficulty in that bowed string instruments do not have frets, requiring ear training and accurate finger placement. The lack of frets, as on the guitar fretboard, does allow greater variability in intonation though a bowed string instrumentalist, such as a violinist, "when unaccompanied, does not play consistently in either the tempered or the natural scale, but tends on the whole to conform with the Pythagorean scale"

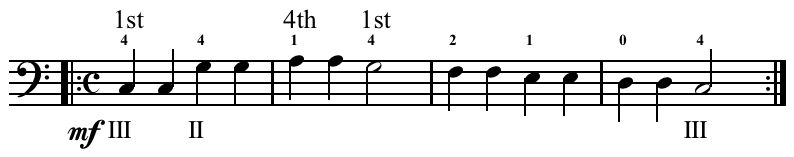
Possible string technique and notation demonstrated on a bit of "Twinkle, Twinkle, Little Star". All the notes are fingered, requiring a shift, except for the two D's.

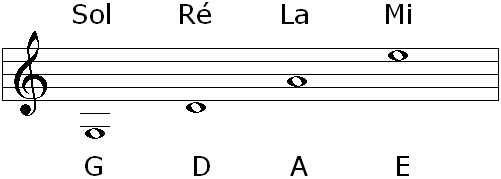
The pitches of open strings on a violin.

The open notes of the highest three strings may be played as stopped notes on the lowest three strings, offering advantages and disadvantages:

Open	Stopped
Easy to play	More technically demanding
No vibrato available	Vibrato and multi-expression available
Essentially fixed pitch	Unlimited ability to adjust intonation
Notes are full and bright	Notes are slightly less resonant
Tone color may be brash, not blending well	Tone color is controllable, and may be more uniform
Pizzicato notes sustain longer	Notes are shorter when plucked
Easier to play two notes	Double-stops are harder, but blend better

Fingered tremolos, the rapid alternation of two notes, are best between two stopped notes on one string, in which case it is limited to the interval of an augmented fourth, or between stopped notes on two adjacent strings:

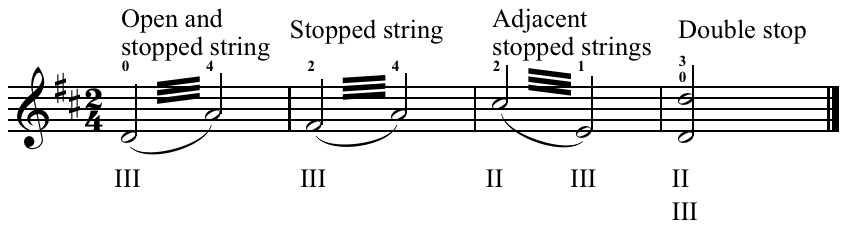
Violin tremolos on perfect fifth, minor third, and major sixth: fingerings indicated above staff (i=1, m=2, r=3, p=4), strings below (G=IV, D=III, A=II, E=I).

== Plucked strings ==
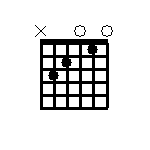
C major chord for guitar (open [as opposed to barre]).

On plucked string instruments with frets, such as the guitar, the pitch of a stopped note is determined by the left hand pressing (stopping) the string at one of the frets.
