= Guitar (disambiguation) =

A guitar is a fretted and stringed musical instrument, which mainly can be found in two types:

- Acoustic guitar, the original instrument known as guitar
- Electric guitar, a guitar that uses electromagnetic induction to convert vibrations of its strings into electric signals

Guitar(s) may also refer to:

== Music ==
=== Albums ===
- Guitar (Peter Lang album), 2003
- Guitar (Tony Rice album), 1970
- Guitar (Sonny Sharrock album), 1986
- Guitar (Frank Zappa album), 1988
- Guitars (Aka Moon album), 2002
- Guitars (Mike Oldfield album), 1999
- Guitars (McCoy Tyner album), 2008
- Guitar (Mac DeMarco album), 2025

=== Songs ===
- "Guitar" (song), by Prince from his 2007 album Planet Earth
- "Guitar", from the 1998 album Prolonging the Magic by Cake
- "Guitar", from the 2004 album Culture Vulture by Jesus Jones
- "The Guitar (The Lion Sleeps Tonight)", by They Might Be Giants

== People ==
- Bonnie Guitar (1923–2019), American musician, singer, and businesswoman
- Odon Guitar (1825–1908), American Civil War general and politician
- Guitar (nickname), people nicknamed "Guitar"

== Other uses ==
- The Guitar (film), a 2008 American drama
- Guitar, a musical project of German musician Michael Lückner
- Guitar, a character in Song of Solomon, a 1977 novel by Toni Morrison
- Guitar.com, online magazine about the guitar

== See also ==
- The Guitar (disambiguation)
- Alto guitar (disambiguation)
- Acoustic guitar
- Five-string guitar (disambiguation)
- Flamenco guitar
- Eight-string guitar
- Eleven-string alto guitar
