= Guitar (nickname) =

As a nickname, Guitar may refer to:

- Guitar Gable (1937–2017), American Louisiana blues, swamp blues and swamp pop musician
- Guitar Gabriel (1925–1996), American blues musician whose unique style has been referred to as "Toot Blues"
- Guitar Nubbit (1923–1995), American blues guitarist and singer most notable for "Georgia Chain Gang"
- Guitar Shorty (1934–2022), American blues guitarist, singer and songwriter known for his style and stage antics
- Guitar Slim (1926–1959), American blues guitarist in the 1940s and 1950s, best known for the million-selling song "The Things That I Used to Do"
- Guitar Slim Jr. (born 1952), American New Orleans blues guitarist and singer
- Johnny "Guitar" Watson (1935–1996), American blues / funk guitarist, best known for chart single "A Real Mutha for Ya".

== See also ==
- Guitar (disambiguation)
