= Classical guitar with additional strings =

Guitar with more than six strings

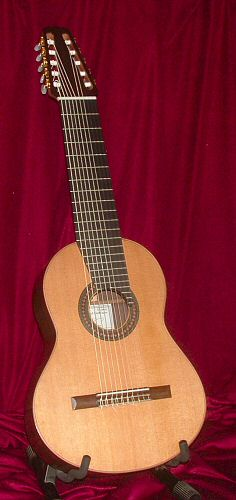
Ten-string classical guitar

A classical guitar with additional strings is a nylon-string or gut-string classical guitar with more than six strings, in which the additional strings pass over a fingerboard so that they may be "stopped" or fretted with the fingers. These are also known as extended-range guitars, and should not be confused with harp guitars (in which the added strings do not pass over a fingerboard).

== Seven-string ==
While the invention of the seven-string guitar has sometimes been attributed to Russian guitarist and composer Andrei Sychra, guitar historian Matanya Ophee has found evidence that seven-string classical guitars may have already existed in Europe in the late 18th century, when Sychra was just beginning his career.

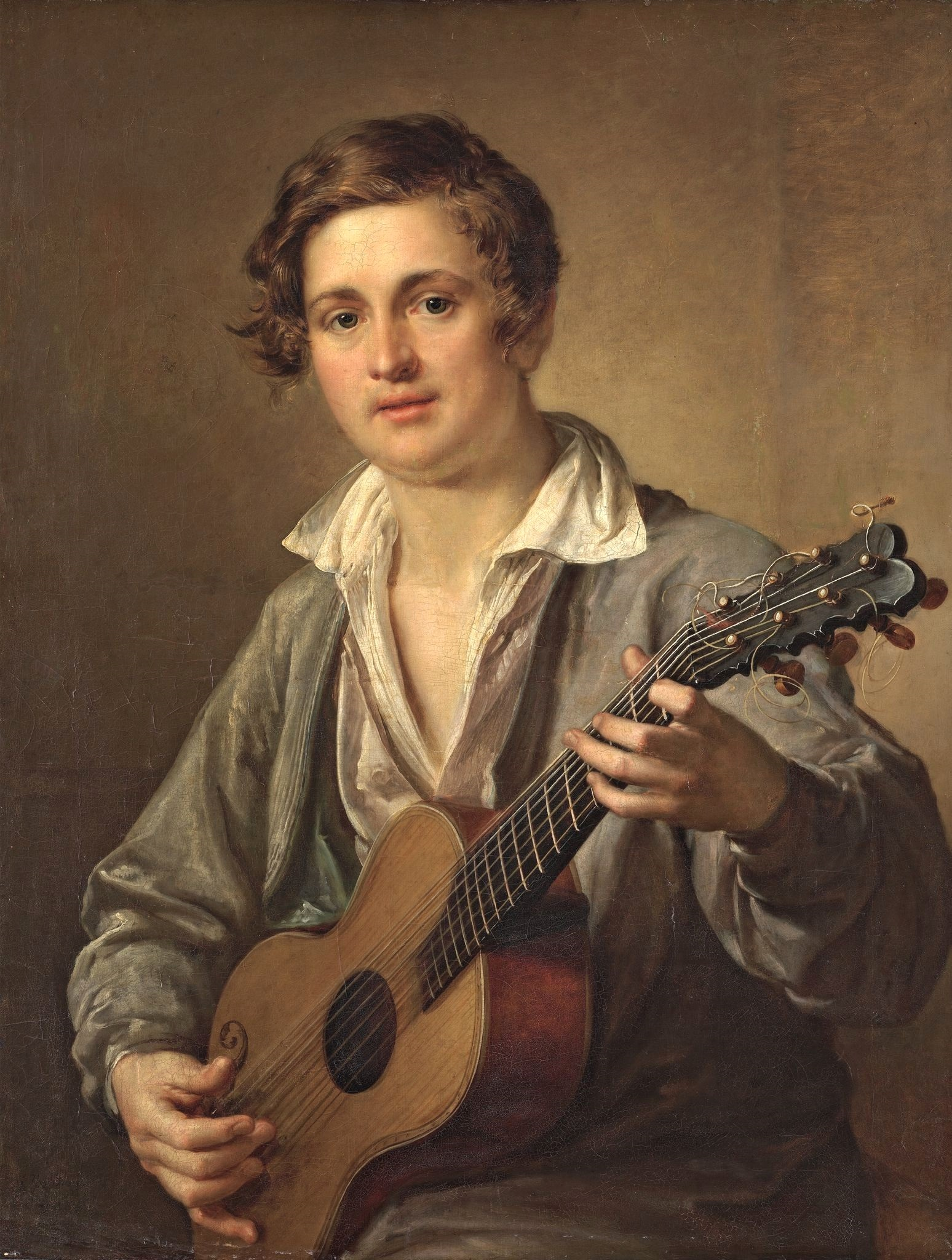
A seven-string Russian guitar

There is no question, however, that Sychra was a great proponent of the seven-string instrument, having written a method, and more than one thousand compositions for the instrument. Seventy-five of these pieces were republished in the 1840s by Stellovsky, then again in the 1880s by Gutheil. Some of these were published again in the Soviet Union in 1926.

Sychra's guitar was a gut-string "classical" variation of the traditional Russian Gypsy Guitar (now usually steel-strung), and tuned in a similar manner, to an open 'G' chord:

- D2 - G2 - B2 - D3 - G3 - B3 - D4

The modern seven-string classical guitar is usually tuned the same as the modern standard six-string instrument, with the addition of a low 'B' string:

- B1 - E2 - A2 - D3 - G3 - B3 - E4

As with any guitar, many tuning variations are possible, and not uncommon.

== Eight-string ==
Eight-string classical guitars are generally tuned with two extra basses ([BD]EADGBE) that vary in pitch depending on the piece being played. Another common variation is to add an extra bass and treble string. The extra treble is almost always tuned to A, while the added bass string usually falls on A, B, or C.

Paul Galbraith and Alexander Vynograd are two of the most notable 8 string players who use the extra high and low string tuning. Galbraith generally tunes (B)EADGBEA which puts standard 6 string guitar chord voicings and scale shapes within the neck and allows him to read lute tablature directly (a whole step higher). Vynograd chooses to tune AEADGCEA (notice the b string is tuned up a half step) which allows him to play the top 6 strings like a guitar a 4th higher. Vynograd writes his music on a grand staff in a different key and plays as if the guitar was tuned EBEADGBE.

8-string guitarist Javier Reyes of the progressive metal band Animals as Leaders also plays 8-string classical guitar for which he uses the tuning EBEADGBE.

The Brazilian guitarist Raphael Rabello also adopted the 8 string guitar on many of his presentations also Australian guitarist Laszlo Sirsom plays the 8-string Classical guitar (BEADGBEA tuning).

=== Brahms guitar ===
The Brahms guitar was developed by guitarist Paul Galbraith and luthier David Rubio to allow the music of Brahms to be played more comfortably on the guitar. Information: 8 string guitar

== Nine-string ==
Late 18th and early 19th-century method books for nine-string guitars exist, but examples of these instruments are rare. Modern nine-string guitars are almost exclusively steel-string or electric instruments.

== Ten-string ==
Includes the Decacorde - a historical romantic guitar - which was tuned C2-D2-E2-F2-G2-A2-D3-G3-B3-E4 and the modern 10-string guitar, which has various tunings.

=== Yepes Ten-string ===
The Yepes 10-string guitar adds four strings (resonators) tuned in such a way that they (along with the other three bass strings) can resonate in sympathy with any of the 12 chromatic notes (or their primary harmonics) that can occur on the higher strings; the idea behind this being an attempt at enhancing and balancing sonority.

Yepes Ten-string Guitar Tuning

The tuning of the Yepes ten-string guitar is:

- Gb2 - Ab2 - Bb2 - C2 - E2 - A2 - D3 - G3 - B3 - E4

Or, written enharmonically:

- F#2 - G#2 - A#2 - C2 - E2 - A2 - D3 - G3 - B3 - E4

== Eleven-string ==
The eleven-string alto guitar was developed by Swedish luthier Georg Bolin in the 1960s, and Bolin altgitarrer (Swedish for alto guitars, singular altgitarren) are now rare and valuable. The Bolin alto guitar most often has eleven strings, but a thirteen-string version also exists.

The eleven-string alto guitar is played by guitarists such as John Francis, Stefan Östersjö and Göran Söllscher and is often used in performances of Bach on the guitar.

The 11-string archguitar built by American luthier Walter Stanul is played by guitarists such as Peter Blanchette .

External links

- altoguitar.com, site dedicated to the Bolin altgitarren.
- Alto Guitar Links.
- Stefan Östersjö web page.
- User description of their Bolin pattern alto guitar.
- John Francis Web Page (Composer/Guitarist)

== Thirteen-string ==
The 13-string "Chiavi-Miolin" guitar is played by Anders Miolin and created by Swiss luthier Ermanno Chiavi.

Luthier Michael Thames has developed the 13-string "Dresden" designed to function as a baroque lute for guitarists.

Bolin created a thirteen-string version of his eleven-string alto guitar, but the eleven-string version has been the one adopted by other makers.

External links

- "Chiavi-Miolin"
- "Dresden"
