= Mattias Schulstad =

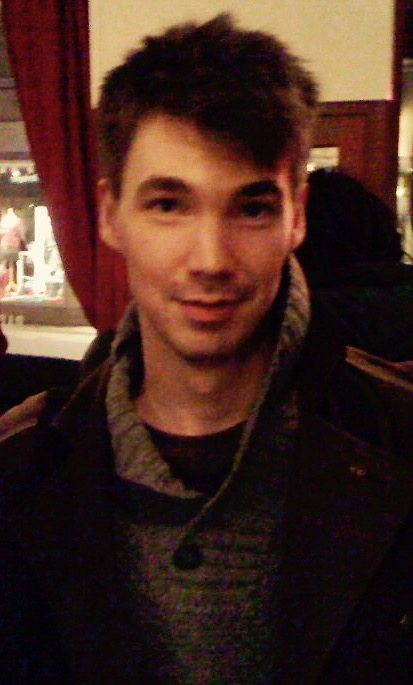

Background information
- Born: November 8, 1984 (age 41); Stockholm, Sweden
- Genre: Classical
- Occupations: Classical guitarist
- Instruments: 1971 Ignacio Fleta e hijos

Mattias Schulstad (born November 8, 1984) is a Swedish classical guitarist.

== Early life and education ==
Mattias Schulstad was born near Stockholm, Sweden and began to play the guitar in Nacka Municipal Music School and at Södra Latins Gymnasium. He continued his education at the Malmö Academy of Music with Göran Söllscher and at the Juilliard School.

== Career ==
Schulstad's first major recital was at age 17 at the Stockholm International Guitar Festival, and he has appeared on Spanish television for Televisión Española, and on radio in the United States for WQXR and NPR. Schulstad's debut recording Invocación explores the music of Spanish composer Francisco Tárrega and his influences from Chopin, as well as his legacy through his students Miguel Llobet and Emilio Pujol. It was chosen as CD of the Week by Classic FM, which calls Schulstad "brilliant", and Album of the Week by WQXR, which states Schulstad "has an innate feel for the music of Tárrega.” Gramophone magazine, named Invocación Gramophone 'Choice'; William Yeoman stating: “The playing throughout is refined, intelligent and highly musical; the tone, though never sweet, is fulsome and appealing. An outstanding debut.” Schulstad has been featured on Classic FM, KUSC, WFMT, Swedish Radio, as well as having garnered a following on YouTube. Appearances include those at the Uppsala International Guitar Festival, Musik vid Siljan and Strathmore, as well as having made two appearances each at the Gustavus Artist Series at Gustavus Adolphus College, and at the Sun Valley Winter Artists Series, in Sun Valley, ID. Composers Jakub Ciupiński and Ryan Francis have written guitar concertos for Schulstad, premiered with Metropolis Ensemble in New York and Pittsburgh New Music Ensemble.

== Instrument ==
Mattias Schulstad plays a guitar made by Ignacio Fleta e hijos from 1971, and uses strings by Albert Augustine; Regal trebles and Blue basses. The guitar was passed on to Schulstad from his first teacher Erik Möllerström, who was able to acquire it during his studies in Barcelona, Spain, through the avail of his teacher, Eduardo Sainz de la Maza.

== Inspiration ==
Mattias Schulstad is particularly inspired by singers Jussi Björling and Victoria de los Ángeles, pianists Alicia de Larrocha and Artur Rubinstein, and by guitarist Julian Bream. He is a self-confessed Radiohead fan.
