= Five-string guitar =

Five-string guitar or five-string may refer to:

== Plucked ==
- Baroque guitar, c. 1600–1750
- bass guitar, with five strings (also often with four or six strings)
  - extended-range electric bass guitar, with five strings (also often with six or occasionally more strings)
- five-string banjo (also often with four or six strings)
- six-string guitar with one string removed, often the low "E", and retuned
- vihuela, from Spain, Portugal, or Italy c. 1450-1550 (also often with six courses of strings)
  - Mexican vihuela, c. 1800–present, often played in mariachi groups

== Bowed ==
- a five string violin, a modern version of a violin with an extra string (six and seven string electric violins also exist)

== See also ==
- Guitar (disambiguation)
