= Göran Söllscher =

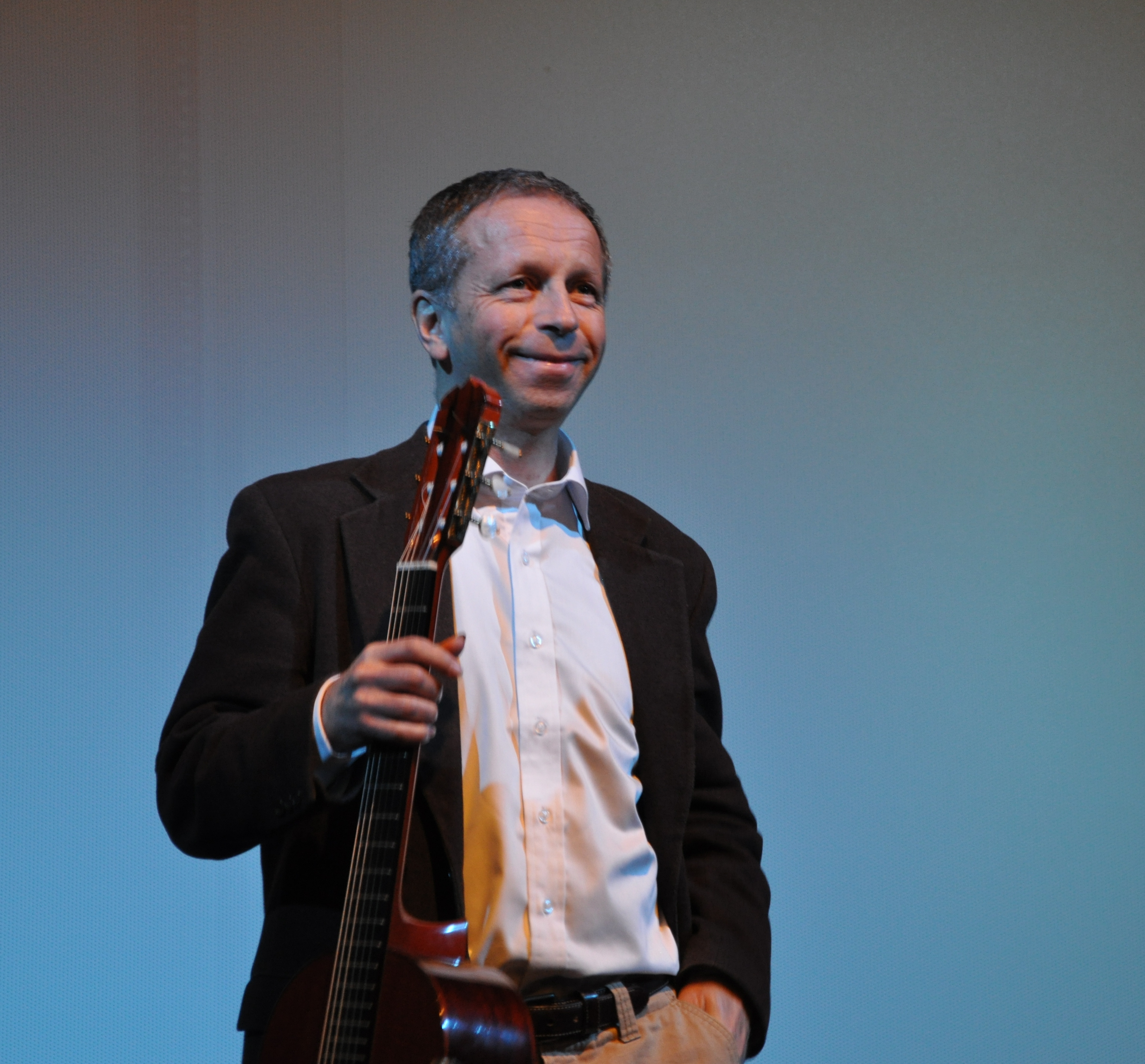

Background information
- Born: December 31, 1955 (age 70); Växjö, Sweden
- Genres: Classical music
- Occupation: Musician
- Instrument: Guitar
- Years active: 1963–present
- Label: Deutsche Grammophon

External audio
- You may hear Sollscher performing works by Johann Sebastian Bach in 1961; Here on Archive.org
- You may hear Sollscher with Gil Shaham performing works by Niccolo Paganini in 1992; Here on Archive.org

Göran Söllscher (born 31 December 1955) is a Swedish award-winning virtuoso classical guitarist known for his broad range of musical interpretations, ranging from Bach to the Beatles. Söllscher's international career began during his years of education at the Royal Conservatory of Copenhagen in Copenhagen, Denmark when at the age of 23, he won the Concours International de Guitare in Paris, 1978. He was signed by German record label Deutsche Grammophon, the largest label featuring classical guitarists. As of 2005, Söllscher had released 19 records, which altogether have sold over a million copies.

== Early life ==
Söllscher was born in Växjö, on the south-east Swedish mainland, and grew up in Kalmar. He started playing a musical instrument from the age of seven.

== Career ==
Söllscher has regularly played with most Scandinavian orchestras, and has toured North America, Europe, Japan and China. He has played with the Camerata Bern, the New Japan Philharmonic, the English Chamber Orchestra, the Royal Philharmonic Orchestra and the Chamber Orchestra of Europe, and for conductors including Claudio Abbado, Alexander Gibson and Esa-Pekka Salonen. In 1991 Söllscher participated in an international guitar festival honoring Joaquin Rodrigo, and later joined the Malmö Conservatory faculty. He has been called the "grand old man of guitarists". Söllscher is known for playing lute music by Baroque composers, such as Weiss and J.S. Bach, on a custom-made eleven-string alto guitar. He is also a professor of guitar at Lund University, and his students include Georg Gulyás and Mattias Schulstad.

== Personal life ==
Today, Söllscher lives in Vitemölla, a small village on Österlen on the east coast of Skåne, not far from Kivik, where the annual Kivik's market takes place. He has a wife, Kerstin Söllscher, and two children, Anna, who is a flautist and singer, and Johan, who is a guitarist. They often perform as a trio, called "Trio Söllscher".
