= Dorris Henderson =

American-born, UK-based folk singer and autoharp player (1933–2005)

Background information
- Born: February 2, 1933; Lakeland, Florida, United States
- Died: March 3, 2005 (aged 72) London, England
- Genres: Folk music, pop
- Occupation: Singer
- Instrument: Autoharp
- Years active: Early-late 1960s, 1999-2003

Dorris Henderson (February 2, 1933 – March 3, 2005) was an American-born, United Kingdom-based folk music singer and autoharp player.

== Early years ==
Born in Lakeland, Florida but raised in Los Angeles, she was the daughter of an African American clergyman and the granddaughter of a Blackfoot Native American. The blues musician, Guitar Nubbit, was her uncle. She initially worked as a civil servant, but became interested in music after seeing a performance by Odetta, at the folk venue Ash Grove. She soon became a regular at Sunset Boulevard's jazz clubs and began to perform autoharp version of tunes from Alan Lomax's The Folk Songs of North America. Henderson got her break when she met Lord Buckley – who called her "the Lady Dorris" – and joined him for a series of stage shows in Hollywood, including an appearance singing "Rock of Ages" on one of Buckley's live albums, In Concert.

== Full-time music career ==
Having gained some recognition from her association with Buckley, Henderson decided to devote her attentions to music full-time and moved to New York City in order to do so, at a time when the city's Greenwich Village area was the centre of a boom in American folk music. Henderson quickly became a friend of leading scene figures such as Dave Van Ronk, Fred Neil, Paul Simon – becoming one of the first artists to cover Simon with her version of "Leaves That are Green" – and Bob Dylan. She made a brief appearance in the latter's film Dont Look Back.

== Move to the UK ==
Henderson's brother served in England with the United States Air Force and, following encouragement from him, she travelled to London, staying at a hotel in the Hampstead area. Singing with her autoharp, Henderson soon became a regular feature at The Troubadour, a centre of the folk revival, later explaining that she sang folk ballads rather than blues because she was "a city girl". After meeting John Renbourn at The Roundhouse, she offered the young guitarist the chance to accompany her when she won a residency on the BBC2 television programme Gadzooks! It's All Happening, appearing alongside such stars of the time as Tom Jones and Sandie Shaw. The duo of Henderson and Renbourn recorded two albums together, There You Go (1965) and Watch the Stars (1967), before Renbourn left to link up with Bert Jansch. After an encounter with the Dutch folk singer Cobi Schreijer at the Roundhouse, Henderson undertook a European tour encompassing thirteen countries, and lived for some time in the Netherlands, where she also recorded.

== Later years ==
Early in 1968, Henderson formed a rock band, Tintagel, with Ian McDonald, later of King Crimson, but the band was not well received and soon disbanded. Later in 1968, Henderson replaced Kerrilee Male as the singer with the band Eclection, performing with them at the Isle of Wight Festival 1969. Following their demise she launched Dorris Henderson's Eclection with her son Eric Jones as guitarist.

After marrying Mac McGann, formerly of the Levee Breakers, Henderson settled in Twickenham and largely retired from music, bar some jingle work and a few appearances with Bob Kerr. Following a re-release of There You Go in 1999, Henderson returned to music on a more regular basis, culminating in the 2003 album Here I Go Again, a work featuring Renbourn and a number of other former colleagues and described by Henderson as 'my musical autobiography'.

Henderson died at Charing Cross Hospital, Fulham, in London, in 2005, from cardiac failure.

== Discography ==
- With John Renbourn: There You Go Columbia SX 6001 1965
- With John Renbourn: Watch the Stars Fontana TL 5385 1966
- Rotterdam Blues SHR VR 108 (EP)
- Here I Go Again Market Square MSMCD117 2003
