= Eleven-string alto guitar =

Extended-range classical guitar

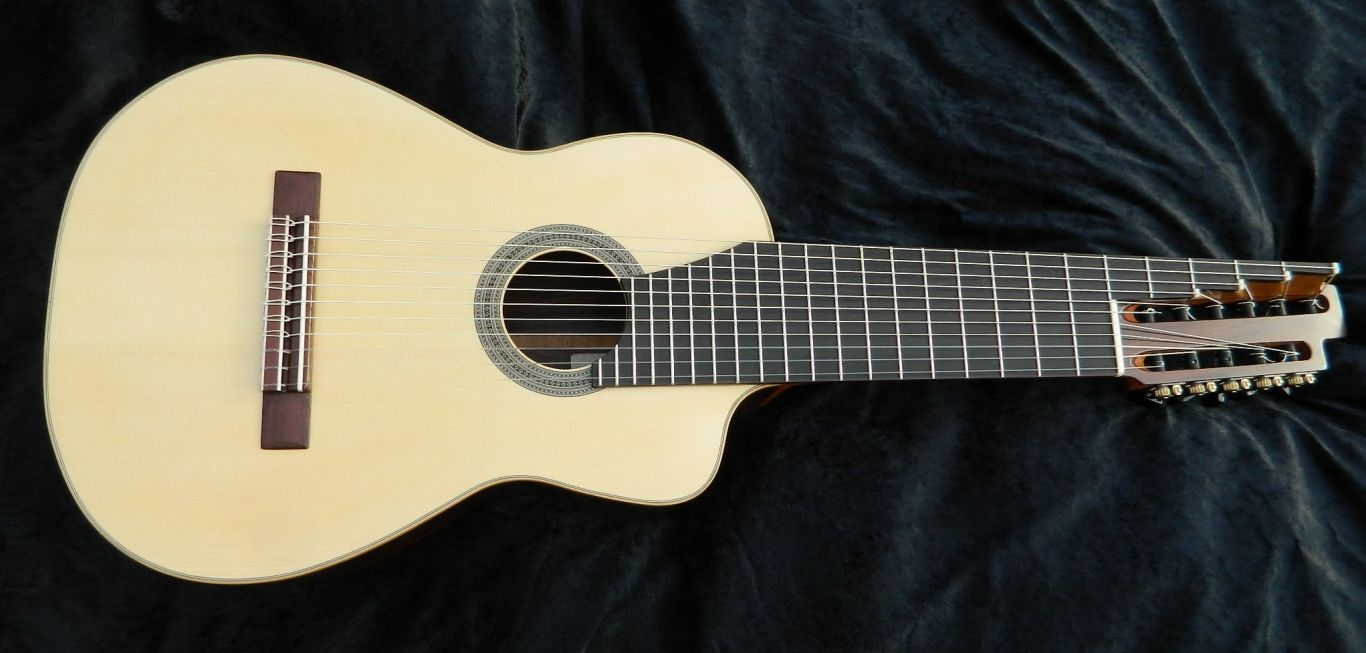
11-string alto guitar

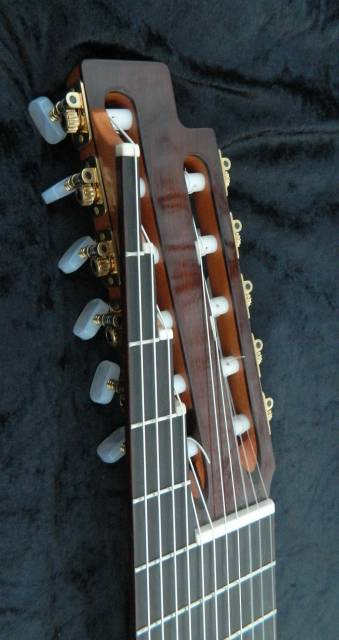
Head of 11-string alto guitar

The eleven-string alto guitar (also known as altgitarr, archguitar, or Bolin guitar) is an extended-range classical guitar developed by Swedish luthier Georg Bolin in the 1960s.

Original Bolin instruments are now rare and valuable. The Bolin alto guitar most often has eleven strings, but Bolin also made a thirteen-string version.

The 11-string alto guitar is a multi-string classical guitar, which generally refers to classical guitars with more than six strings. Classical guitars with extra strings can have from seven to 13 or more strings. However, an 11-string is the most useful for performing lute music, particularly Bach and Weiss. The first six strings are tuned in the same intervals as the normal classic guitar. Therefore, a musician can play with conventional fingering on those strings.

In the United States, luthier Walter Stanul makes performance instruments ranging from 11 to 13-strings called the Archguitar. The design and the body shape of this guitar is similar to the vihuela, and thus it is fundamentally different from the Bolin design.

== History ==
Georg Bolin first constructed 11-string alto guitar with collaboration with Swedish guitarist Per-Olof Johnson in the 1960s. Johnson is the teacher of a well-known guitarist Göran Söllscher who made this instrument famous through his extensive usage of Bolin's 11-string alto guitar.

Johnson was fond of lute music, but the difference in playing techniques between guitar and lute is significant, and he was looking for a way to play lute music using guitar playing technique. Thus, the design goal was specifically to allow guitarists to play renaissance lute music.

This design introduced two main elements. The first was to provide conventional lute tuning by tuning the first six strings a minor third higher (hence the name "alto guitar"). It is equivalent to putting a capo on the third fret of the normal prime guitar. The second element was to add five extra strings to accommodate low notes.

== Tuning ==
The typical 11-string alto guitar tuning is (from low to high strings): Bb1 C2 D2 Eb2 F2 G2 C3 F3 Bb3 D4 G4.

== Makers ==
Current luthiers who build 11-string alto guitars, primarily located in Sweden, include Heikki Rousu and Roger Strömberg. Ermanno Chiavi in Switzerland is known for his 13-string guitar built for Anders Miolin, but he builds 11-string guitars as well. Chiavi's guitar has the scale length of a normal classical guitar, 650mm, and is tuned in the same manner as classical guitar. Therefore, it is technically not an "alto" guitar. Yoshimitsu Hoshino in Japan built 11-string alto guitars with the same specification with Bolin's design in 1980s. However, he no longer makes them. Based in Paris, Liberto Planas is considered as one of the leading experts of the 11-string guitar with more than 90 instruments with his signature.

== Performers ==
Some of the guitarists who use the instrument are as follows:

- Göran Söllscher
- Peder Riis
- Paulo Martelli
- Kozo Kanatani
- Andreas Koch
- Moran Wasser
- Nikita Koshkin

== See also ==
- Extended-range classical guitar
- Alto guitar
