= The Guitar =

The Guitar may refer to:

- The guitar, the musical instrument
- The Guitar (film), a 2008 film starring Saffron Burrows
- "The Guitar" (Gunsmoke), a 1956 television episode
- "The Guitar (The Lion Sleeps Tonight)", a song and EP by They Might Be Giants
- The Guitar (painting), a 1912 painting by Georges Braque

== See also ==
- Guitar (disambiguation)
