= Paulo Martelli =

- Born: January 2, 1966 (age 59)
- Instrument: Classical guitar

Paulo Martelli is a Brazilian classical guitarist. He received musical training in New York where he studied at The Juilliard School and The Manhattan School of Music. He has garnered awards and honors in prestigious national and international competitions and has concertized at halls throughout the United States, Canada and Brazil. He is noted for being an advocate and practitioner of the eleven-string alto guitar, an unusual non-standard instrument that is well suited to the performance of music originally intended for the lute.

== Discography ==
CDs

- Paulo Martelli plays Diabelli, Paganini, Harris, Castelnouvo Tedesco, Gri Music, 1994
- Roots, The Woodhouse Records, USA, 2000
- miosótis, Brazil, 2011
- A Bach Recital, Guitarcoop, 2017
- Geraldo Vespar: 20 Estudos Populares Brasileiros para Violão, Guitarcoop, 2020

DVDs

- Movimento Violão, 2009 - 2010
- Movimento Violão, 2012
- A Bach Recital, 2017
