= Alto guitar =

Alto guitar may refer to:

- Eleven-string alto guitar, also called the altgitarr, the Swedish name given to it by its Swedish inventor
- Six-string alto guitar, a classical guitar with light strings and a small body, designed to be tuned higher than the normal classical guitar
- Tenor guitar, when tuned to G-C-E-A one fourth higher than the top four strings of the modern classical guitar

== See also ==
- Guitar (disambiguation)
