= Guitar Nubbit =

American blues guitarist and singer (1923–1995)

- Born: Alvin Hankerson; November 23, 1923; Fort Lauderdale, Florida, United States
- Died: June 30, 1995 (aged 71) Boston, Massachusetts, United States
- Genres: Blues
- Occupations: Guitarist, singer
- Instruments: Guitar, vocals
- Years active: 1960s–1995
- Label: Bluestown Records

Alvin Hankerson (November 23, 1923 – June 30, 1995), better known as Guitar Nubbit, was an American blues guitarist and singer. His most notable song was "Georgia Chain Gang", which was originally released in 1962 as a single on Bluestown Records.

He was the uncle of the folk music singer and autoharp player Dorris Henderson.

== Life and career ==
Hankerson was born in Fort Lauderdale, Florida. During a hurricane when he was three years old, he lost the tip of his right thumb, which led to his lifelong nickname, Nubbit (sometimes shortened to Nub). He spent most of his formative years in Georgia and then relocated to Boston, Massachusetts, in 1945. He attempted to teach himself to play the guitar, but after a year of trying he gave up the instrument in 1949. However, by 1954, he could afford guitar lessons and enlisted Bill Bryant, a former music teacher from Rocky Mount, North Carolina, to teach him. Guitar Nubbit eventually mastered the rudiments of the instrument. He then performed locally, playing and singing mainly his own compositions, whilst maintaining his daytime job as a barber.

In 1962, Guitar Nubbit recorded his first tracks for the small Bluestown Records label. His first single release was "Evil Woman Blues" backed with "Laura", which was recorded in his adopted hometown of Boston. This was swiftly followed by his most noteworthy song, "Georgia Chain Gang", backed with "Hard Road". He recorded further tracks the same year, and in Ipswich, Massachusetts, in 1963, but most of these were unreleased for years. His 1965 release of "Big Leg Woman" was a cover version of Blind Boy Fuller's song. The releases sparked some interest in a mainly white audience, during the so-called blues revival from the late 1940s to the 1960s. His offerings lacked variety, and despite some exposure in his local folk scene, he drifted into obscurity. Various attempts were made to revive his fortunes, including an EP released in 1971 by XX Records, but all the numbers contained on that disc were from the previous decade. A rather unusual seven-track, 12-inch 45-rpm record entitled Re-Living the Legend! was released in 1989. The compilation album Blues Town Story, Vol. 1, released by Wolf Records in 1998, includes a couple of previously unreleased tracks; one side of the disc includes work by an even more obscure bluesman, Alabama Watson.

Guitar Nubbit died in June 1995, aged 71, in Boston.

== Discography ==
=== Singles and EPs ===
Year	Title	Record label
1962	"Evil Woman Blues" / "Laura"	Bluestown Records
1962	"Georgia Chain Gang" / "Hard Road"	Bluestown Records
1962	"I've Got the Blues" / "New Orleans"	Bluestown Records
1965	"Big Leg Woman" / "Crying Blues"	Bluestown Records
1971	"Georgia Chain Gang" / "Hard Road" / "I've Got the Blues" / "Big Leg Woman" / "New Orleans" / "Evil Woman Blues" / "Laura" (EP)	XX Records

=== Compilation albums ===
Year	Title	Record label
1989	Re-Living the Legend!	Matchbox Records
1998	Blues Town Story, Vol. 1	Wolf Records
