= Vitemölla =

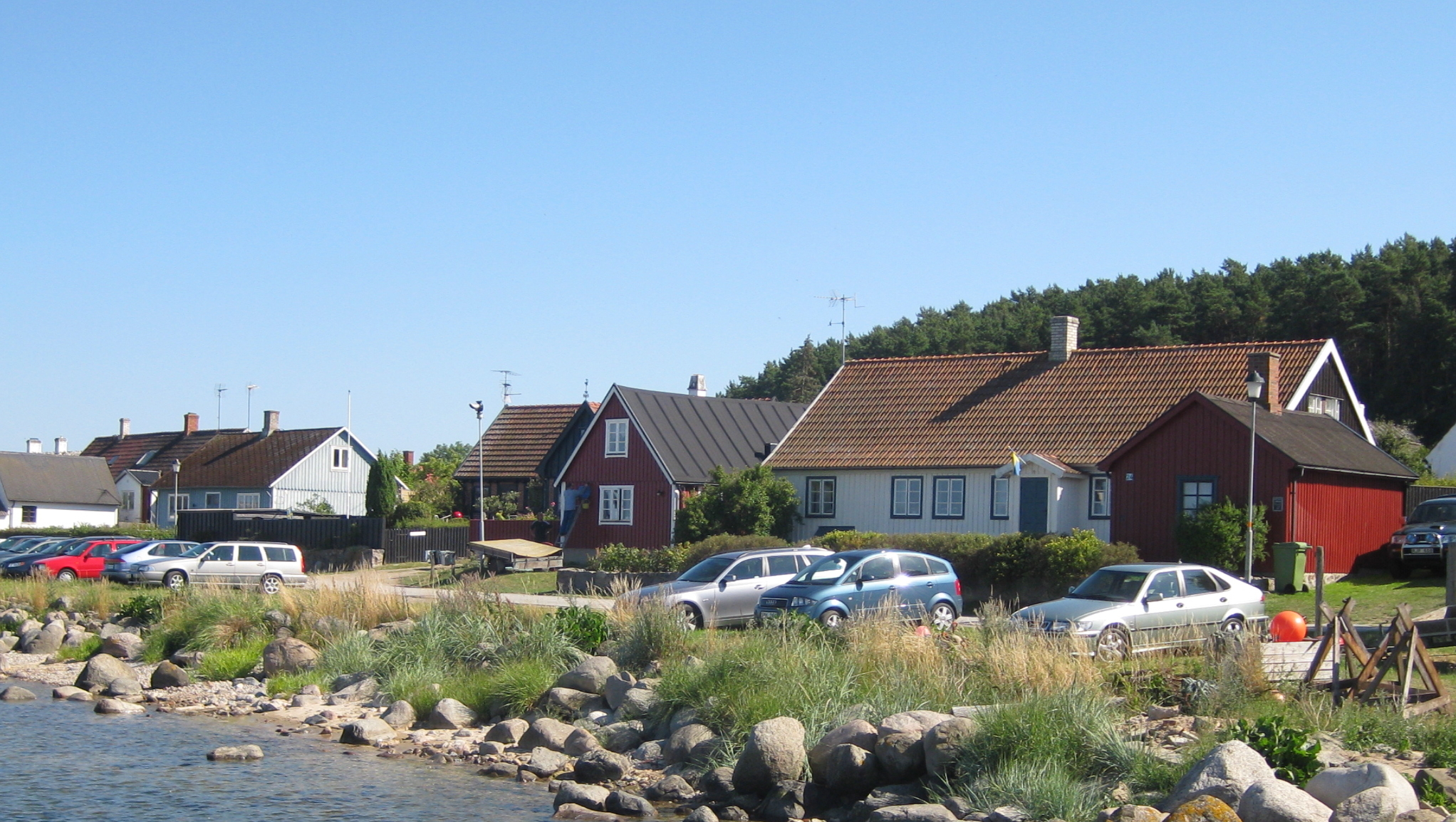
- Vitemölla

- Location within Skåne Location within Sweden
- Coordinates: 55°42′N 14°12′E
- Country: Sweden
- Province: Skåne

Population
  - Total: 80

Vitemölla (Swedish pronunciation: [vɪtɛˈmœ̂lːa]) is a small fishing village in the southern part of Sweden, in Skåne. It's situated on the Bight of Hanö right next to Kivik. Vitemölla's population is about 80 but grows during the summer. The annual fair Kiviks Marknad, which claims to be the largest fair in Sweden, is held on an open area between Vitemölla and Kivik.
