= Gutheil =

Gutheil is a German surname of:

- Emil Arthur Gutheil (1889–1959), Polish-American psychiatrist
- Gustav Gutheil (1868–1914), German conductor and composer, husband of Marie Gutheil-Schoder
- Marie Gutheil-Schoder (1874–1935), German soprano
- Ulrike Gutheil (born 1959), German jurist

== See also ==
- Gutheil (publisher), founded in 1859 by Alexander Bogdanovich Gutheil, later an imprint of Serge Koussevitzky's Editions Russes
