= Michael Lückner =

German musician

Michael Lückner is a German musician known for his work in electronic and experimental music. He has released music under the names Digital Jockey and Guitar and was a member of the electronic music duo Computerjockeys, which he formed with Wolfgang Hagedorn.

== Career ==
According to AllMusic, Lückner began experimenting with tape recording before turning to sampling software as a means of composing and arranging music. In 1995, he formed the duo Computerjockeys with Wolfgang Hagedorn. The duo used computers to create and perform sample-based music in real time.

Computerjockeys released their self-titled debut album in 1999 on Harvest/EMI Music, followed by Plankton in 2001 on Island Records/Universal Music. The duo also supplied music for MTV Germany's broadcasts of the anime series Golden Boy and Lupin the 3rd.

In 2000, Lückner began releasing solo recordings under the name Digital Jockey. In 2002, he adopted the name Guitar for a project combining electric guitar with electronic production and sampling. The debut album, Sunkissed, was released by Morr Music in 2002 and drew on the sound of the shoegaze band My Bloody Valentine.

The subsequent album Honeysky appeared in 2004 on the Japanese label Third Ear. With Tokyo (2006), Lückner incorporated traditional Japanese instruments, including the koto and pipa, into his electronic arrangements. The album featured vocalist Ayako Akashiba, a regular collaborator on Guitar recordings. Reviews in Pitchfork and PopMatters discussed Lückner's approach to combining these instruments with electronic production.

The 2007 album Dealin with Signal and Noise continued Lückner's experiments with guitar-based music. The album also involved the American band Voyager One, while Akashiba contributed vocals to Guitar recordings. The German music website laut.de reviewed the album, and the magazine Groove described it as a return to distorted guitars following the experiments on Tokyo.

In 2008, US CD reissues of Honeysky and Saltykisses appeared through Clairecords.

In 2009, Lückner released Friends through the Japanese label & records. The album featured Japanese-language vocals by Akashiba and was described by the label as lighter and more pop-oriented than earlier Guitar releases.

With It's Sweet to Do Nothing! (2011), Lückner combined chamber-music instrumentation, including harp, piano, violin and double bass, with programmed rhythms and samples. The album was released through Clairecords.

In 2014, Lückner released The House of the Hapless Hearts as a digital album exclusive to Bandcamp.

In 2025, the Japanese label P-Vine issued a vinyl edition of Sunkissed, originally released by Morr Music in 2002. It was the album's first vinyl release.

In January 2026, Lückner released Sunkissed 2025 HiFi Edit, a new mix and remaster of the 2002 album, through Bandcamp. In February 2026, he released Celestial Bodies, another Bandcamp-exclusive album.

== Discography ==
The following is a selection of albums released under Lückner's principal project names.

=== With Computerjockeys ===
- Computerjockeys (1999)
- Plankton (2001)

=== As Digital Jockey ===
- 8 Studies in Dub Considering Global Welfare as Well as International Charity Stamps and Letters (2000)
- Paradies und Fragment – Neun Studien in klassischer Musik (2002)
- Codeine Dub (2005)

=== As Guitar ===
- Sunkissed (2002)
- Honeysky (2004)
- Saltykisses (2006)
- Tokyo (2006)
- Dealin with Signal and Noise (2007)
- Friends (2009)
- It's Sweet to Do Nothing! (2011)
- The House of the Hapless Hearts (2014)
- Sunkissed 2025 HiFi Edit (2026)
- Celestial Bodies (2026)

=== As Michael Lückner ===
- The green Moth and the pink Shell (2022)
