= Anders Miolin =

Swedish classical guitarist (born 1961, dead 21 april 2026)

Anders Miolin (born 28 May 1961, died 21 April 2026) was a concert guitarist performing on the 13-stringed guitar "Chiavi-Miolin".

Anders Miolin was born in Stockholm, Sweden, and entered the Royal Danish Academy of Music in Copenhagen at the early age of 15. He studied with the Karl Scheit pupil professor Per-Olof Johnson and graduated with a teaching and concert diploma. He continued his studies with Professor Johnson at the Music Academy in Malmö, Sweden, where he finished with a soloist diploma and obtained a second soloist diploma at the Music Academy in Basel, Switzerland, after three years of studies with the famous Andrés Segovia pupil Oscar Ghiglia.

Anders Miolin is a professor at the Zürich University of the Arts and gives concerts and master classes all over the world. He has recorded seven solo CDs for the internationally known label BIS Records and continues to be an active concert and recording artist creating innovative and unorthodox programs. Together with the Zürich luthier Ermanno Chiavi he has developed the 13-stringed guitar “Chiavi-Miolin”.

ANDERS MIOLIN 28. Mai 1961 - 21. April 2026 Nach langer Krankheit ist er still im Schlaf von uns gegangen. In Liebe Familie Miolin Familie Nilsson
