= List of extended-range guitar players =

While the six string guitar has been more or less the standard instrument since the mid-19th century, guitarists and luthiers have experimented with additional strings to extend the range of the instrument practically since the emergence of the modern guitar form, sometime in the 15th century. Seven, eight, nine, ten and more strings have been used by guitarists seeking to increase the range of pitches available from the instrument. Some of these guitars are ethnic instruments, specific to different cultures such as Russian and Brazilian guitars. During the 90's the seven-string guitar became popular among metal bands such who used the additional string for extra low end. Extended range classical guitars (especially 8- and 10-string instruments) are being seen more frequently and have found favor with guitarists who play Renaissance and Baroque lute music, as well as those who wish to transcribe piano and orchestral works for the guitar.

There are some classical players of the seven-string guitar who also use an extended treble range by adding more frets at the high end (similar to some Viennese guitars of the 19th century.)

This is a list of guitarists who have made notable usage of extended-range guitars or have played a specifically notable instrument. This list does not include multi-neck guitarists or harp guitarists.

== Alphabetical listing ==
=== A ===
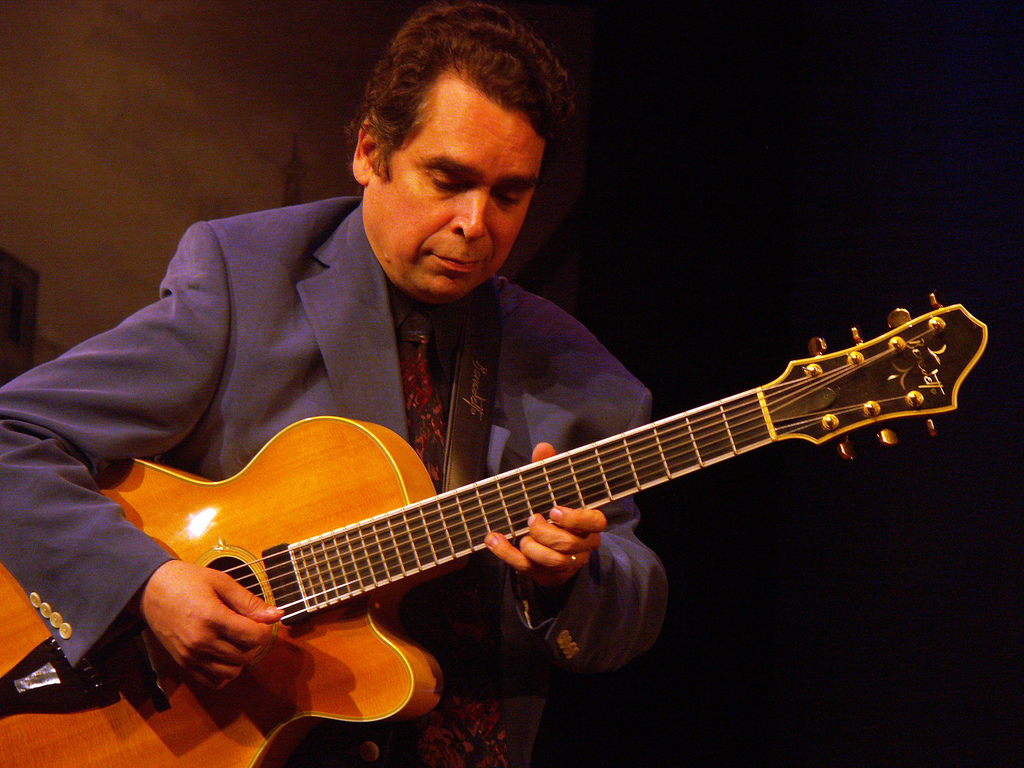
Jazz guitarist Howard Alden.

- Tosin Abasi (born 1983) is a guitarist, formerly of Reflux, who has since started his own solo project known as Animals as Leaders. He started playing extended range instruments when a friend recommended an Ibanez seven string guitar to him. He has used extended range instruments almost exclusively since. He is noted for often incorporating elements of metal and shred while also having clean passages in his songs, making much use of his 8-string guitar's range to cover both the bass and guitar tracks for his compositions simultaneously on one guitar. He attended the Atlanta Institute of Music.
- Howard Alden (born 1958) is an American jazz guitarist who plays a seven-string guitar and has been described as the most impressive and creative member of a new generation of jazz guitarists.

=== B ===
- Gerry Beaudoin is a jazz guitarist, composer and arranger, and member of the New Guitar Summit. He uses seven-string Benedetto guitars.
- Matt Bellamy (born 1978) is the lead vocalist and guitarist of Muse. He uses a custom-built seven-string guitar tuned to AADDGBE for the song "Citizen Erased".
- Wes Borland (born 1975) is the guitarist of Limp Bizkit and Black Light Burns. Borland used seven-string Ibanez guitars during his early days with Limp Bizkit. Borland now uses his six-string signature Yamaha model almost exclusively.
- Lenny Breau (1941–1984) was a Canadian jazz guitarist known for his fingerstyle technique. Late in his career played a custom seven-string guitar with an additional .008-gauge high A string rather than the usual low bass string.
- Chris Broderick (born 1970) is the former lead guitarist for Megadeth. Previously he was in Jag Panzer and toured with Nevermore.
- Ron "Bumblefoot" Thal plays double necks Vigier Fretless/Fretted as his main guitars.

=== C ===
- Stephen Carpenter (born 1970) is the guitarist of Deftones and plays both seven- and eight-stringed guitars from his endorser ESP.
- Laura-Mary Carter is the guitarist of Blood Red Shoes and plays a seven-string electric guitar built by Yuri Landman.
- Dino Cazares (born 1966) is the guitarist for Fear Factory, Divine Heresy, and Asesino. Cazares uses custom eight-string guitars, and mainly custom Ibanez seven-string guitars with Fear Factory.
- Rusty Cooley is a guitarist, formerly of Outworld. He has performed session work for Austrian Death Machine. He uses seven- and eight-string signature models from Dean Guitars. He owned an eight-string guitar made by Conklin Guitars before he received his Dean eight-string. His eight-string models feature fanned frets because he swaps the low F# string for a high A string.
- Dino 7 Cordas (1918–2007) was a Brazilian guitar player renowned for his work with seven-string guitar.
- Ronald Patrick Escheté (born August 19, 1948) is an American seven-string jazz guitarist. He is the first person to record a cover version of "Christmas Time Is Here", which Vince Guaraldi wrote for the Charlie Brown television program.

=== D ===
- Dave Davidson of the technical death metal band Revocation plays mostly on a series of 7-string guitars, including a signature model released through Jackson Guitars.

=== G ===
- Paul Galbraith (born 1964) is a Scottish classical guitarist who plays an eight-string guitar with an additional high and low string in a cello like manner.
- Shane Gibson was the lead guitarist for stOrk as well as Jonathan Davis and the SFA and played various seven-string and eight-string models from Carvin and Nil Guitars.
- Egberto Gismonti (born 1947) is a Brazilian guitarist and pianist who favors the 8-string classical guitar.
- Paul Gilbert (born 1966) is an American Rock n' Roll guitarist who played with Mr. Big and Racer X.
- Livio Gianola (born 1962) Italian nylon-string guitarist, considered a Flamenco guitarist. Only non-Spanish guitarist to compose and play for the prestigious Ballet Nacional de España.

=== H ===
Charlie Hunter in 2007.

- Curtis Hall (1986) is known for playing guitar for Pretty Vague and A Ronin's Test.
- Mårten Hagström (born 1971) is most known for his use of seven- and eight-stringed guitars with the Swedish metal band Meshuggah.
- Matthew Heafy shares roles as lead guitarist and vocals of metal band Trivium. Heafy used various seven stringed guitars for Trivium's fourth album entitled Shogun. He originally used a custom made Dean 7 string for live performances, but now plays a Gibson Custom Shop 7 string Explorer as his endorsement with Dean expired.
- Scott Hull is an American grindcore musician, and the current guitarist and producer for Pig Destroyer, Agoraphobic Nosebleed, and Japanese Torture Comedy Hour. He has also done work with Anal Cunt. He is known for using both eight string and seven string guitars. Until 2013, Pig Destroyer didn't have a bass player, so Hull used a modified amplifier set up to fill the void of having no bassist.
- Charlie Hunter (born 1967) is a jazz guitarist and composer. Hunter's instrument of choice is a custom built eight stringed built by luthier Ralph Novak. His instrument's wide range allows him to play both lead and bass guitar simultaneously.

=== I ===
- Ihsahn (born Vegard Sverre Tveitan 1975) is the guitarist and vocalist of the black metal band Emperor and uses both seven and eight stringed Ibanez guitars. He now uses Aristides seven and eight string guitars, a Dutch brand.

=== J ===
- Jason Becker

=== K ===
- Kerry King (born 1964) used a seven string BC Rich during the recording of Slayer's God Hates Us All.
- Jonas Kjellgren of Scar Symmetry uses seven- and eight-string guitars.

=== L ===
- Jeff Loomis (born 1971) was the lead guitarist for progressive metal band Nevermore, later joining melodic death metal band Arch Enemy. He currently plays various Jackson guitars, including his own JLK Pro signature model.
- Sarah Longfield

=== M ===
- Tony MacAlpine (born 1960) is an American musician and composer. MacAlpine plays seven and eight string guitars with Planet X.
- Misha "Bulb" Mansoor is the lead guitarist for progressive metal band Periphery, who has gained notoriety on the internet as a songwriter, guitarist and producer. Over the course of his career, he has played Ibanez, Music Man, Carvin, Mayones, Jackson, Daemoness Guitars, Decibel Guitars, and Bernie Rico Jr. Both 7 & 8 string guitars. He is well recognized for his very rhythm-based riffs and leads in his musical compositions. His 7 string guitars are usually tuned down in Drop Ab.
- Lucas Mann of Rings of Saturn, an American technical death metal band from the Bay Area, California. He plays 7,8 and 9 String Guitars from Legator Guitars with blisteringly fast rhythms and leads.
- Josh Martin is the guitarist for American progressive-folk band Little Tybee. Playing multiple 8 string guitars, he is famous for developing various tapping techniques as well as furthering Tosin Abasi's "Thump" technique.
- John Mayer (born 1977) is an American musician. He generally plays Fender Stratocasters but has recently been sighted with an eight-string guitar. (He now plays a PRS signature model, and is absolutely not known for playing anything more than 6 strings)

=== N ===
- Per Nilsson of Scar Symmetry uses seven- and eight-string Strandberg and Ibanez guitars.

=== O ===
- Christian Olde Wolbers (born 1973) is the former Fear Factory and current Arkaea guitarist. He uses seven stringed Jackson guitars and has his own signature model.
- Paul Ortiz (born 1984), best known for his work under the pseudonym, or solo project, of Chimp Spanner, uses 7 and 8 string Ibanez guitars.

=== P ===
- Jimmy Page when playing certain songs, most notably "Stairway to Heaven", he uses a double neck SG Gibson.
- Ralph Patt (1929–2010) played guitars with 7–8-strings beginning in 1963 when he invented major-thirds tuning, which he implemented in 1964–1965. Seven-string guitars enabled major-thirds tuning to have the E-e' range of the standard tuning. Patt first experimented with a wide-neck Mango guitar from the 1920s, which he modified to have seven strings in 1963. Later, he purchased six-string archtop hollow-body guitars that were then modified by luthiers to have wider necks, wider pickups, and eight strings. Patt's Gibson ES-150 was modified by Vincent "Jimmy" DiSerio cerca 1965. Luthier Saul Koll modified a sequence of guitars: a 1938 Gibson Cromwell, a Sears Silvertone, a cerca 1922 Mango archtop, a 1951 Gibson L-50, and a 1932 Epiphone Broadway; for Koll's modifications, custom pick-ups by Bill Lawrence accommodated the wide necks and high G♯. He also purchased a seven-string by José Rubio (1967).
- John Petrucci (born 1967) is best known for his work as lead guitarist of the progressive metal band Dream Theater. He has used a seven stringed guitar in standard tuning for at least one song per album since 1994's Awake. Currently, he exclusively uses his signature series Ernie Ball Music Man guitars with DiMarzio humbuckers. He uses a Ernie Ball Music Man eight stringed and also he has used a double neck from the same company. In the past he endorsed Ibanez guitars.
- Eddie Pickard of Infant Annihilator a brutal deathcore group based in Hull, East Yorkshire. He uses both 7 and now 8 string guitars.
- Bucky Pizzarelli (born 1926) is an American 7-string jazz-guitarist known for his work with Benny Goodman and Stephane Grappelli, as well as a string of albums from a solo career dating back to the 1950s.
- John Pizzarelli (born 1960) American jazz guitarist who plays a seven stringed archtop, best known for his work with his father, Bucky Pizzarelli, another 7-string jazz guitarist.

=== R ===
- Hans Reichel constructed and played double neck guitars with extra bridges to generate resonating overtones
- Jason Richardson Lead Guitarist of Chelsea Grin, Ex- Born of Osiris

=== S ===
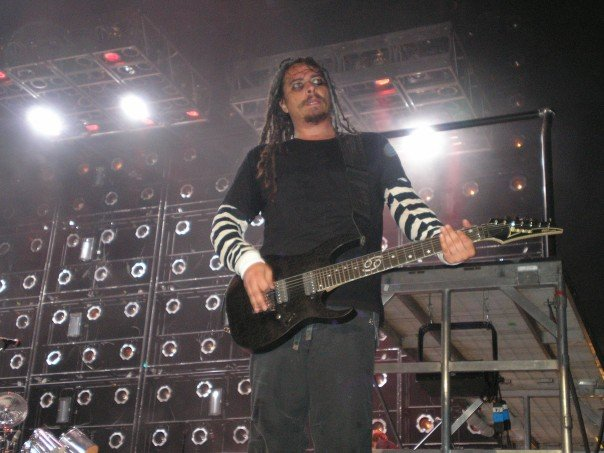
James "Munky" Shaffer.

- James Shaffer (aka Munky born 1970) is the guitarist for nu metal band Korn as well as for his side project Fear and the Nervous System. Shaffer was one of the pioneers in using extended range guitars in metal and currently has his own signature model: the Ibanez Apex.
- Ed Sloan (born 1973) is the guitarist of Crossfade. He uses a Schecter C-7 Blackjack seven stringed guitar.
- Elliott Sharp: "Sharp is an American multi-instrumentalist, composer, and performer. A central figure in the avant-garde and experimental music scene in New York City for over 30 years, Elliott Sharp has released over eighty-five recordings ranging from orchestral music to blues, jazz, noise, no wave rock, and techno music." Among the dozens of instruments he plays, has built or had built for him, a recent addition is a Koll archtop headless 8string.

=== T ===
- Fredrik Thordendal (born 1970) is the lead guitarist and founding member of the Swedish technical-metal band Meshuggah. He used seven-string Ibanez and Nevborn models until the recording of the album Nothing, after which he has used Ibanez 8-string guitars.
- Devin Townsend is a Canadian progressive rock and metal artist. He's used 7-string guitars for several years, including in Strapping Young Lad. He now uses a custom 7 string made by Peavey, which he played on his 2011 album Deconstruction.

=== V ===
- Steve Vai (born 1960) is a rock guitarist who has worked with artists such as Frank Zappa and co-designed the seven stringed Universe electric guitar with Ibanez.
- George Van Eps (1913 to 1998) was an American swing and jazz guitarist played and sevenstring Epiphone from the late 1930s.

=== W ===
- Brian Welch (born 1970) is a guitarist for Korn. Welch plays various Ibanez seven-string guitars including his and Munky's signature model, the K7. On hiatus from Korn, Welch switched to playing custom-built six-string baritone guitars.

=== Y ===
- Narciso Yepes (1927–1997) was a Spanish classical guitarist, virtuoso on the ten-string classical guitar.

== See also ==
- Seven-string guitar
- Eight-string guitar
- Nine-string guitar
- Ten-string guitar
- Extended-range bass
- Harp guitar
- Multi-neck guitar
- Pikasso guitar
- Brazilian guitars
- Russian guitar
