= Eight-string guitar =

Type of guitar with 8 strings

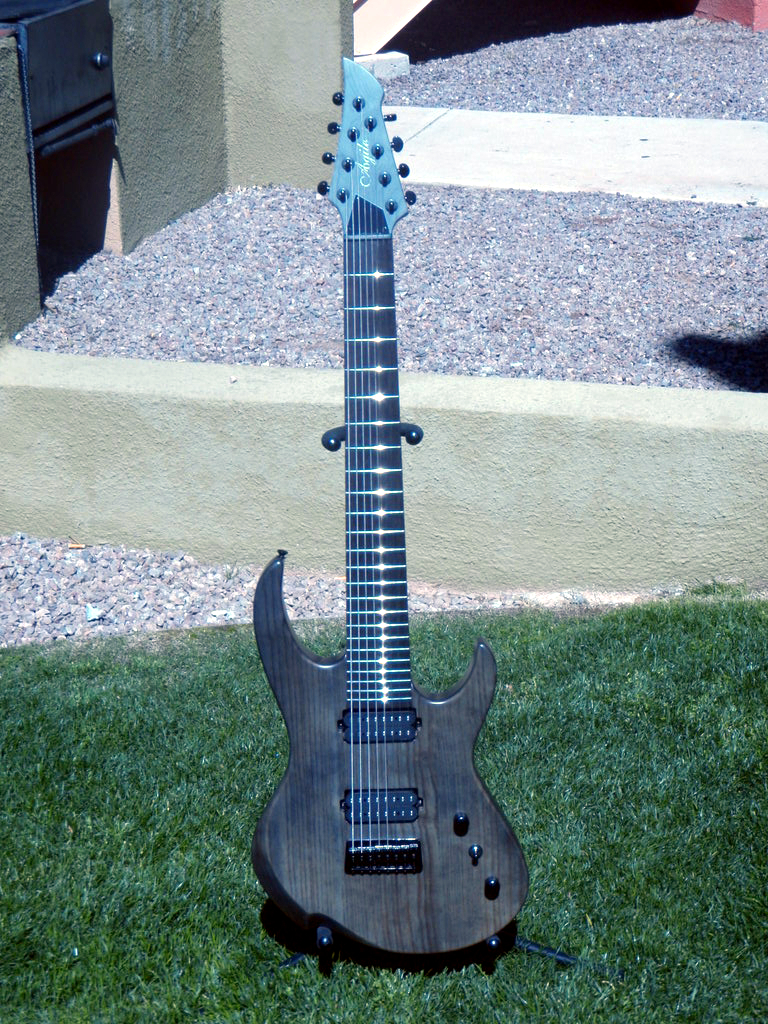
Agile Intrepid

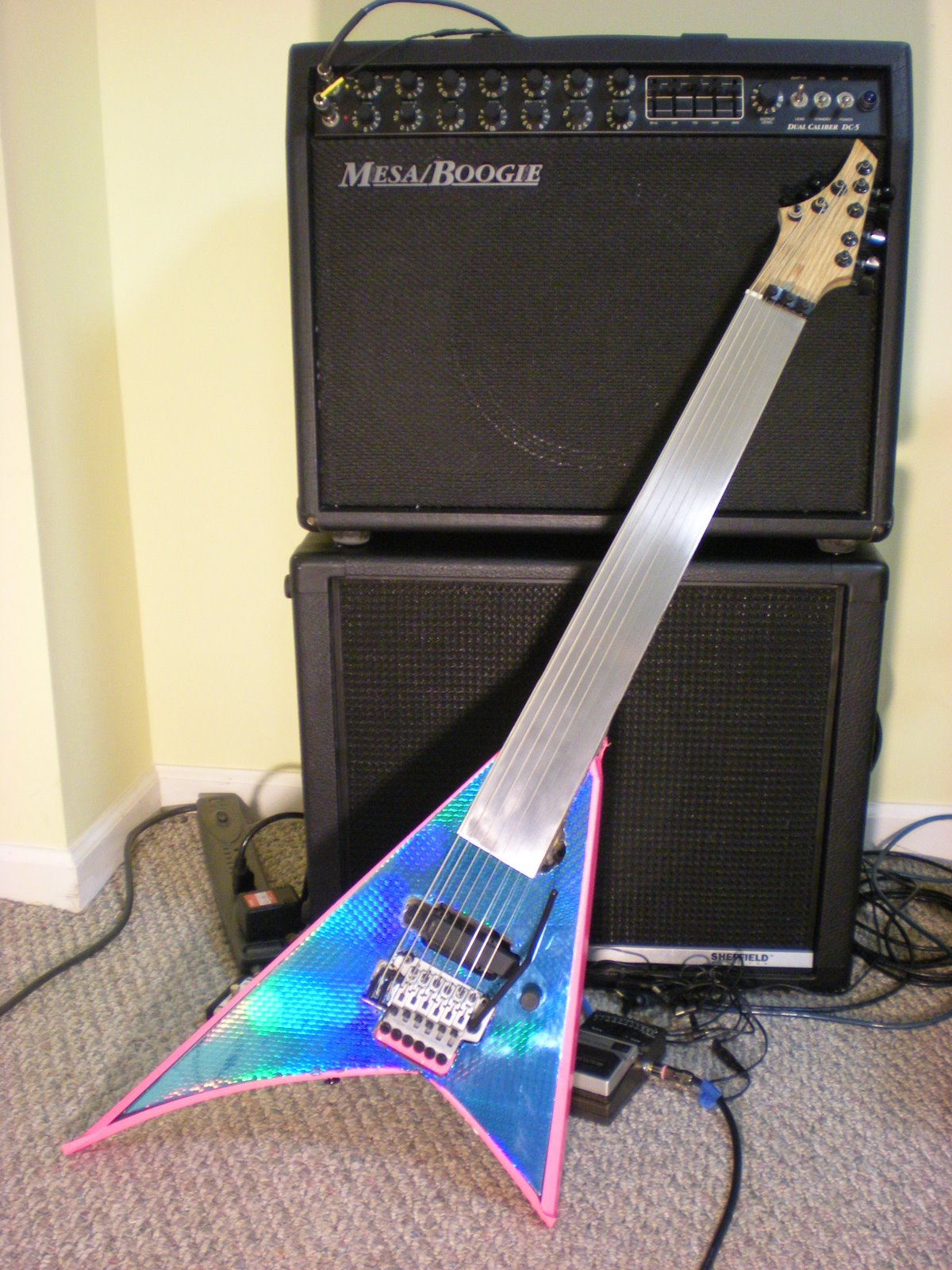
Homemade fretless guitar based on Jackson Rhoads

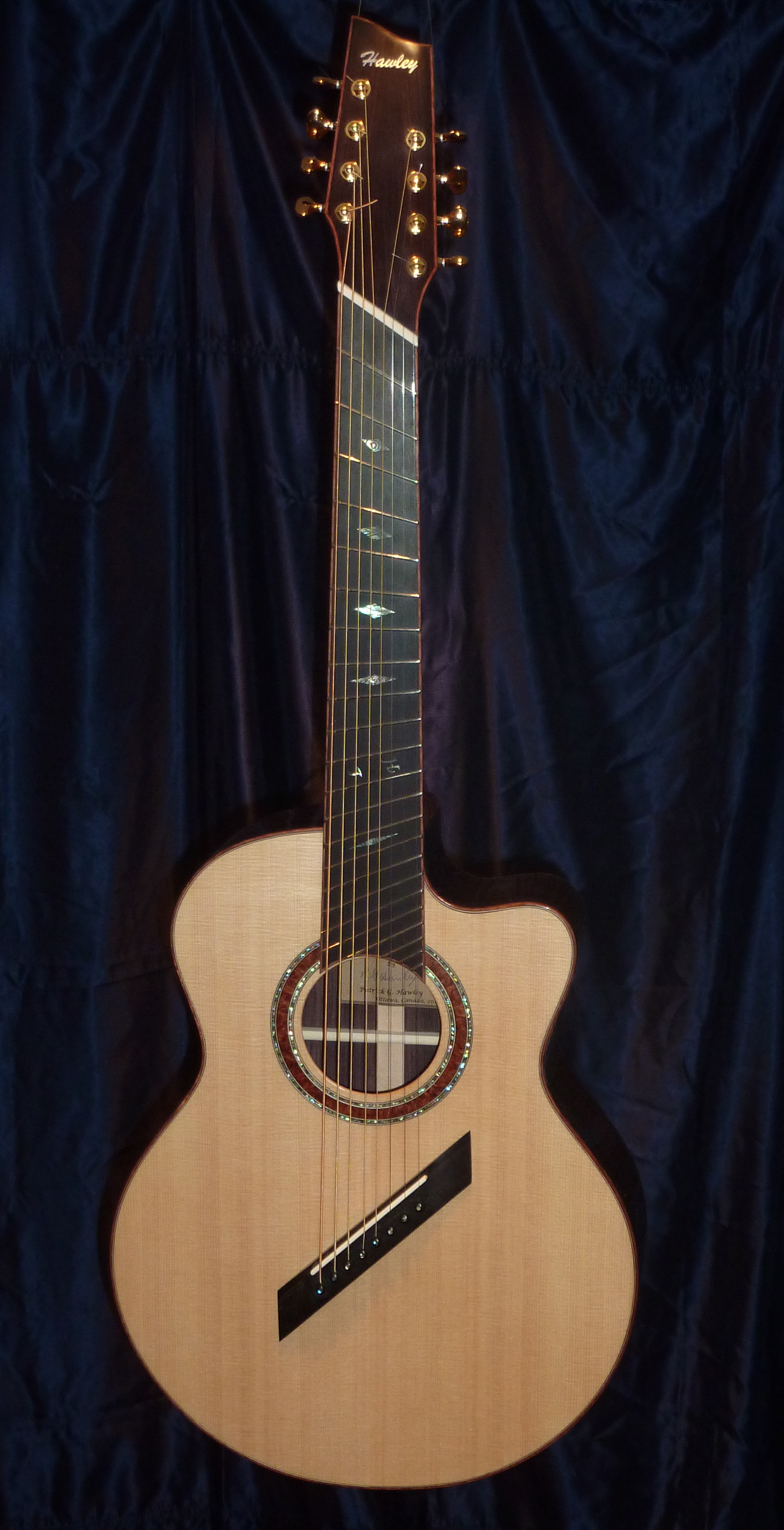
Eight-string multi-scale acoustic guitar by luthier Patrick Hawley of Ottawa, Ontario

An eight-string guitar is a guitar with eight strings, or one more than the Russian guitar's seven. Eight-string guitars are less common than six- and seven-string guitars, but they are used by a few classical, jazz, and metal guitarists. The eight-string guitar allows a wider tonal range, or non-standard tunings (such as major-thirds tuning), or both.

Various non-standard guitars were made in the 19th century, including eight-string guitars played by Italians Giulio Regondi and Luigi Legnani.

Eight-string electric guitars gained popularity among metal bands, largely inspired by Swedish progressive metal band Meshuggah (formed in 1987). Contemporary use outside of metal has picked up in the last decade, and owes much to Animals as Leaders and their stylistic eclecticism.

== Designs ==
=== Semi-acoustic guitar (hollow-body guitar) ===
Seeking a guitar tuning that would facilitate jazz improvisation, Ralph Patt invented major-thirds tuning in 1963. Patt's tuning is a regular tuning, in the sense that all of the intervals between its successive open strings are major thirds; in contrast, standard guitar tuning has one major-third amid four fourths.

Seven-string guitars are needed for major-thirds tuning to have the E-e' range of the standard tuning. Having an eight-string instrument allowed Patt's guitar to have G♯ (equivalently A♭) as its open note. Patt purchased six-string archtop hollow-body guitars that were then modified by luthiers to have wider necks, wider pickups, and eight strings. Patt's Gibson ES-150 was modified by Vincent "Jimmy" DiSerio c. 1965. Luthier Saul Koll modified a sequence of guitars: a 1938 Gibson Cromwell, a Sears Silvertone, a c. 1922 Mango archtop, a 1951 Gibson L-50, and a 1932 Epiphone Broadway; for Koll's modifications, custom pick-ups accommodated Patt's wide necks and high G♯ (equivalently A♭); custom pick-ups were manufactured by Seymour Duncan and by Bill Lawrence. Roy Connors, former member of the 1960s folk singing group, The Highwaymen, reconfigured a Martin O-28 six-string guitar to an eight-string of his own design and received a U.S. Patent on it (#3269247).

=== Solid-body ===
Solid-body eight string guitars are also used by many bands today. The construction of a solid-body eight-string guitar is comparable to that of seven- and six-string variants. The standard tuning (from low to high) is F♯, B, E, A, D, G, B, E. Many prefer to tune the F♯ to a low E (E1), the same note as the lowest string on a four-string electric bass in standard tuning, and providing the guitar with a fuller sound by having three different E strings. This tuning is equivalent to tuning a six-string guitar to Drop D tuning.

Like the seven-string, the first mass-produced eight-string guitar was made by Ibanez guitars in Japan; the RG2228.

=== Scale length ===
The main design issue faced with an eight-string guitar is tuning stability with the lower strings. This is due to the neck being constructed too short, bridge problems such as improper intonation, uneven spacing for floating bridges, or the use of wrong string gauges. Other problems associated with tuning stability rely on the proper setup of the guitar.

Extended range eight string guitars sometimes will have a multi-scale design where the bass strings will be longer than the treble strings (fanned fret design). This helps with proper intonation of the lower strings, improves string tension balance across the strings, improves harmonic overtones, overtone series, and improves inharmonicity. (See also inharmonicity in pianos). The bass strings on an 8 string typically require the saddle to be pulled back a bit more than the other strings to properly set the intonation. Some bridge designs accommodate this by offsetting back the 7th and 8th strings or providing a bit extra room for adjustment. Longer scale lengths require less offset for proper intonation.

== Notable players ==
=== Classical ===
Paul Galbraith began using an eight-string guitar in 1994 when, in collaboration with luthier David Rubio, they designed the Brahms guitar. Galbraith generally tunes AEADGBEA. Egberto Gismonti (born 1947) is a Brazilian guitarist and pianist who favors the 8-string classical guitar. Livio Gianola (Premana, 1964) is an Italian guitarist. It is considered by the specialized critic "The Master of the Eight String Guitar".

=== Jazz ===
Charlie Hunter plays an eight-string guitar made by Ralph Novak of Novax Guitars. Five of the strings are tuned to the standard guitar's upper five (A, D, G, B, E), while three of the strings are tuned to the standard bass guitar's three lowest (E, A, D). The bass and treble sections have separate pickups and are sent to separate amplifiers. Hunter also has a ten-string guitar based on the same principle—a combination of standard six-string guitar and standard four-string bass.

=== Metal ===
The eight-string guitar is used by modern heavy metal guitarists such as Fredrik Thordendal and Mårten Hagström of Meshuggah, Dino Cazares of Fear Factory, Stephen Carpenter of Deftones, Greg Burgess of Allegaeon, Simon Girard and Kevin Chartré of Beyond Creation, Justin Lowe and Trent Hafdahl of After the Burial, Josh Travis of Emmure (ex-The Tony Danza Tapdance Extravaganza and ex-Glass Cloud), Per Nilsson of Scar Symmetry and Meshuggah as a touring member and others. The instrument is particularly associated with the “djent” sound popularized by Meshuggah, Vildhjarta, and Periphery, among others.

Tosin Abasi and Javier Reyes of Animals as Leaders primarily use a drop-E tuning (where the lowest string matches the E1 on a standard-tuned bass guitar) and incorporate "thumping," an adaptation of different bass guitar techniques — the term blankets all sorts of possible note groupings, but primary influences include a style à la funk bassist Larry Graham and Victor Wooten's double thumping technique — as well as harp-like arpeggios extending across the full range of the instrument.

Ihsahn of the black metal band Emperor began playing seven-string guitar in 1999 and first played eight-string guitar on his 2010 album After.

Rusty Cooley tunes his eight-string guitar like a standard six-string expanded in both directions. This tuning offers both deeper bass tones than a conventional guitar and extended range in the higher register for lead melodies.

Guitarist Justin Broadrick of the English industrial metal band Godflesh introduced his eight-string playing on the 2014 Godflesh EP Decline & Fall.

Guitarists Lucas Mann and Joel Omans from the technical deathcore band Rings of Saturn also use eight-string guitars, with Mann primarily making use of a nine-string guitar for the band's 2019 album Gidim. Miles Dimitri Baker, one of their former members, also used one.

Chris Andrews of the death metal band Devourment uses eight-string guitars, starting with the album Obscene Majesty.

John Petrucci of progressive metal band Dream Theater plays an eight-string guitar on the song "Awaken the Master", from Dream Theater's 2021 album A View from the Top of the World and on the song "In the Arms of Morpheus" from Dream Theater's 2025 album Parasomnia.

== See also ==
- Brahms guitar
- Roy Smeck, popular player of the octachorda from the 1920s onwards
- Ten-string guitar
- Nine-string guitar
- Seven-string guitar
- Extended-range bass
- Harp guitar
- Eight-string bass guitar
- Chapman stick
