= Ralph Patt =

American jazz guitarist (1929–2010)

- Ralph Patt playing guitar

Background information
- Born: 5 December 1929; Kittanning, Pennsylvania
- Died: 6 October 2010 (aged 80) Canby, Oregon
- Genres: Jazz
- Instruments: guitar, bass guitar, mandolin, banjo, oud, lute, bouzouki
- Years active: 1950s–2010
- Website: http://www.ralphpatt.com

Ralph Oliver Patt (5 December 1929 – 6 October 2010) was an American jazz guitarist who introduced major-thirds tuning, which can simplify the learning of the fretboard and chords by beginners and facilitate improvisation by advanced guitarists. His use of this tuning was first inspired by the atonal music of Arnold Schoenberg, and later by the jazz of John Coltrane and Ornette Coleman.

He graduated with a degree in geology from the University of Pittsburgh. After his career as a guitarist, he worked as a geologist and as a hydrologist, often consulting on projects related to the U.S. Department of Energy.

== Early life ==
Patt was born in Kittanning, Pennsylvania on 5 December 1929 and studied geology at the University of Pittsburgh.

== Guitar and music theory ==
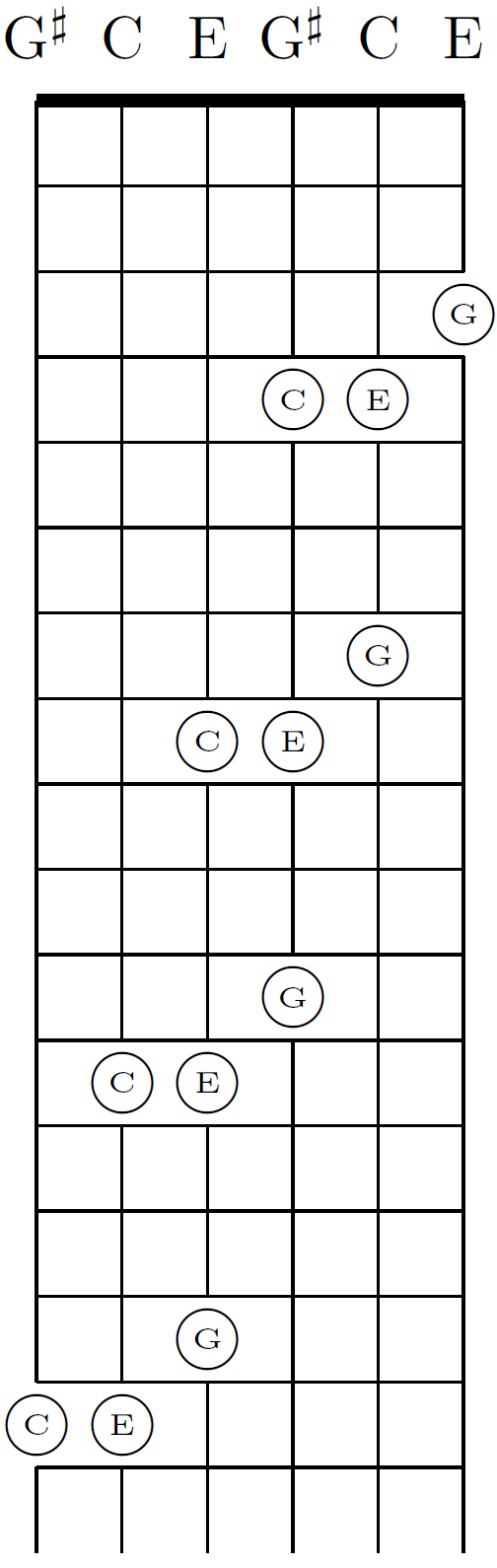
Patt used major-thirds tuning to aid improvisation on the guitar. In it, chord fingerings can always be shifted diagonally, horizontally, or vertically, while maintaining their shape; this is not true of chords in standard tuning.

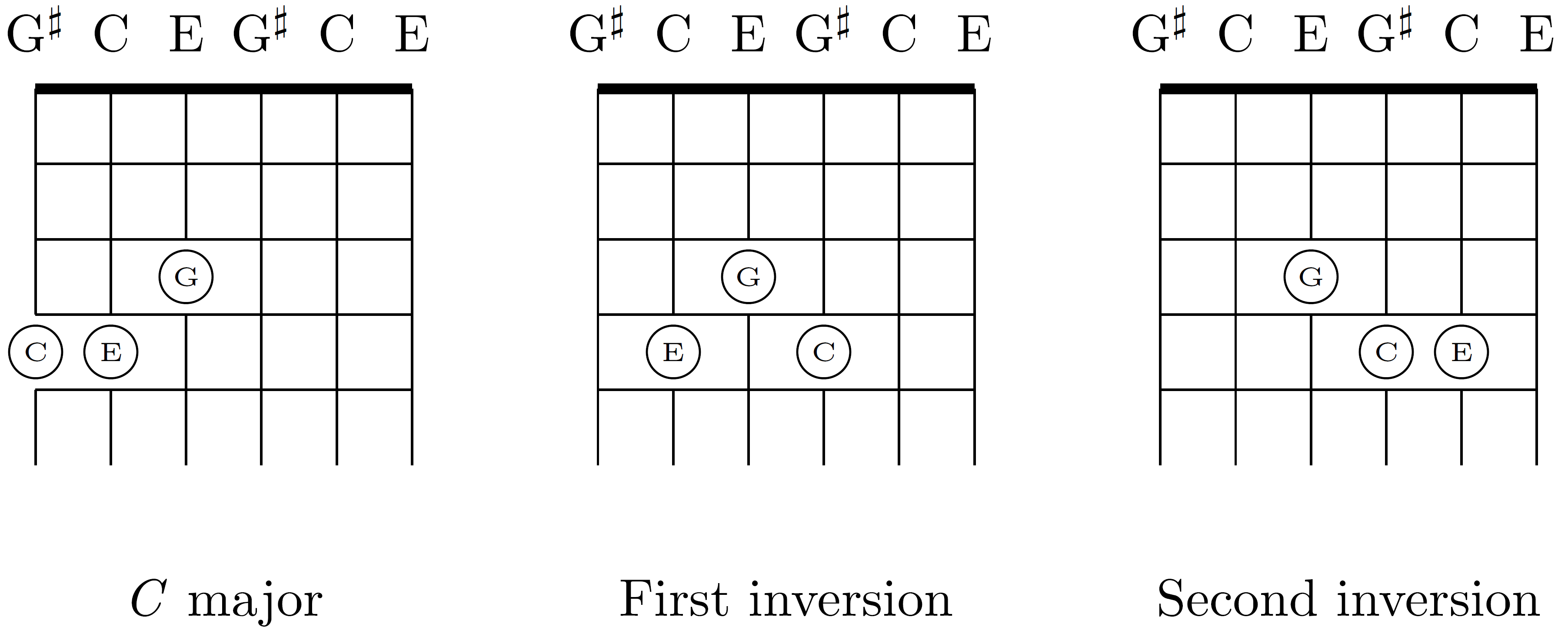
Chords are inverted by shifting notes three strings on the same fret.

While in Pittsburgh, Patt studied guitar under Joe Negri. Patt played rhythm guitar in the style of Freddie Green, who played a Stromberg in the Count Basie Orchestra. Having earned his baccalaureate degree, he joined the United States Army and played guitar in an Army band. Following his 1955 discharge from the Army, Patt played with touring bands, for example, Neal Hefti, Frankie Carle, Les Elgart, Benny Goodman, Richard Maltby, and The Glenn Miller Orchestra.

After touring for five years, Patt settled in New York City, where he worked as musician both at ABC and on Broadway from 1960 to 1970; during this period he regarded Barry Galbraith as his mentor. He studied under George Russell, whose (1959) Lydian Chromatic Concept of Tonal Organization Patt edited. Patt also studied with Gunther Schuller, who himself was a student of Arnold Schoenberg and who used Schoenberg's twelve-tone technique for atonal composition. Patt wanted to be able to play and then to improvise twelve-tone music.

=== Major-thirds tuning ===
Patt was inspired by the jazz of Ornette Coleman and John Coltrane and the atonal music of Schoenberg. Seeking a guitar tuning that would facilitate improvisation, he introduced major-thirds tuning by 1964, perhaps in 1963. Patt's tuning is a regular tuning in the sense that all of the intervals between its successive open strings are the same, major thirds; in contrast, the standard guitar tuning has one major third amid four perfect fourths. Patt used major-thirds tuning during all of his work as a session musician after 1965 in New York.

One benefit of this tuning is that the chromatic scale (the consecutive twelve notes of the octave) can be played in one position on four adjacent frets (e.g. when beginning on a low E string, the F chromatic scale uses frets 1-4 on every string). Major and minor chords are played using two successive frets, and so require only two fingers; other chords—seconds, fourths, sevenths, and ninths—are played on three successive frets. For each regular tuning, using the same fingering pattern anywhere on the fretboard gives the same kind of chord, a property that simplifies beginners' learning of chords and that simplifies advanced players' improvisation. In contrast, the same chord fingerings cannot be shifted around the fretboard in the standard tuning E-A-D-G-B-E, which requires four different chord shapes for major chords depending on whether their root note is on the third, fourth, fifth, or sixth string.

Having exactly three equidistant pitch classes for its open strings (for example, a guitar tuned G♯–C–E–G♯–C–E has only the pitch classes {C,E,G♯}), every major-thirds tuning repeats the same notes in each octave. This repetition at the same distance simplifies the learning of chords and improvisation. Chord inversion is especially simple in major-thirds tuning; it always consists of moving one or two fingers to the same fret three strings away.

==== Guitars with seven and eight strings ====
Major-thirds tuning covers a smaller range of notes than standard guitar tuning, and so Patt started using seven-string guitars, which enabled major-thirds tuning to have the E−e' range of the standard tuning. He first experimented with a wide-neck Mango guitar from the 1920s, which he modified to have seven strings in 1963. In 1967 he purchased a seven-string by José Rubio. Patt used major-thirds tuning when he performed as a session musician in New York City after 1965.

Later, he purchased six-string archtop guitars and had them modified to wider necks, wider pickups, and eight strings. Patt's Gibson ES-150 was modified by Vincent "Jimmy" DiSerio, who worked in the firm of John D'Angelico, c. 1965. Luthier Saul Koll modified several guitars for Patt: a 1938 Gibson Cromwell, a Sears Silvertone, a c. 1922 Mango archtop, a 1951 Gibson L-50, and a 1932 Epiphone Broadway; Koll's modifications included custom pickups to accommodate Patt's wide necks and high G♯ string; the pickups were manufactured by Seymour Duncan and by Bill Lawrence.

Besides these guitars, Patt regularly played other stringed instruments on recordings: classical guitar, 12-string guitar, 6-string bass guitar, mandolin, banjo, and oud. Patt stated that "the only guys that didn't have to double on dates were the Tony Mottolas and the Johnny Smiths"; Tony Mottola and Johnny Smith were famous jazz guitarists, and "doubling" refers to a musician's switching from one instrument to another (particularly within a family of instruments) during the same concert or recording. Patt worked primarily as a studio musician from 1970 to 1975.

=== Scholarship ===
Patt developed a webpage with extensive information about major-thirds tuning. This webpage was part of a website with extensive information for jazz guitarists. Patt's website published his Vanilla book, which contains the chord progressions for four hundred jazz standards, from "After you've gone" to "Zing! went the strings". Its title refers to "Just play the vanilla changes", advice to young pianists from Lester Young. It was updated in 2008.

His website followed earlier contributions to guitar scholarship and instruction. In 1962, Patt wrote his Guitar chord dictionary (1962). Living in New York City in the 1960s, he studied with Chuck Wayne, with whom he wrote The guitar arpeggio dictionary (1965), which became one of the top-selling titles for its publisher, Henry Adler.

== Return to geology ==
As a studio musician in the 1970s, Patt had to play less jazz and more rock and roll, and so he changed careers. He returned to geology while continuing to pursue jazz as an avocation. Around 1975 he began working on his doctoral degree in hydrogeology. Employed by the US Department of Energy, he specialized in groundwater contamination from nuclear waste; as a research hydrogeologist, he accepted assignments worldwide and had extensive travels in Ukraine and Russia.

He was employed by Oregon's Department of Water Resources, where he served as its expert on the risks to the Columbia River from the Hanford Site. As a hydrological geologist (hydrologist), he was appointed to a panel of outside experts that reviewed and then "slammed" the U.S. Department of Energy's report on the safety of the underground storage of high-level nuclear waste at Hanford.

== Death ==
In 2002 and 2010, Patt's hometown was listed as Canby, Oregon, near Portland. Having been diagnosed with kidney cancer in 2007, Patt died at the age of 80 on 6 October 2010 in Canby at home. To honor his memory, the Ralph Patt Memorial Scholarship provided full tuition, room, and board for a college student to attend the Mel Brown Jazz Camp in 2011.

== See also ==
- Predecessors of Patt's The vanilla book of chord progressions of jazz standards:
  - Fake book
  - Real Book
- Free jazz of Ornette Coleman and John Coltrane.
- Lists of guitarists, playing
  - Extended-range guitars
  - Jazz
  - Tony Corman's guitar web page (links to M3 method books and videos)
