= Multi-scale fingerboard =

Stringed instrument part

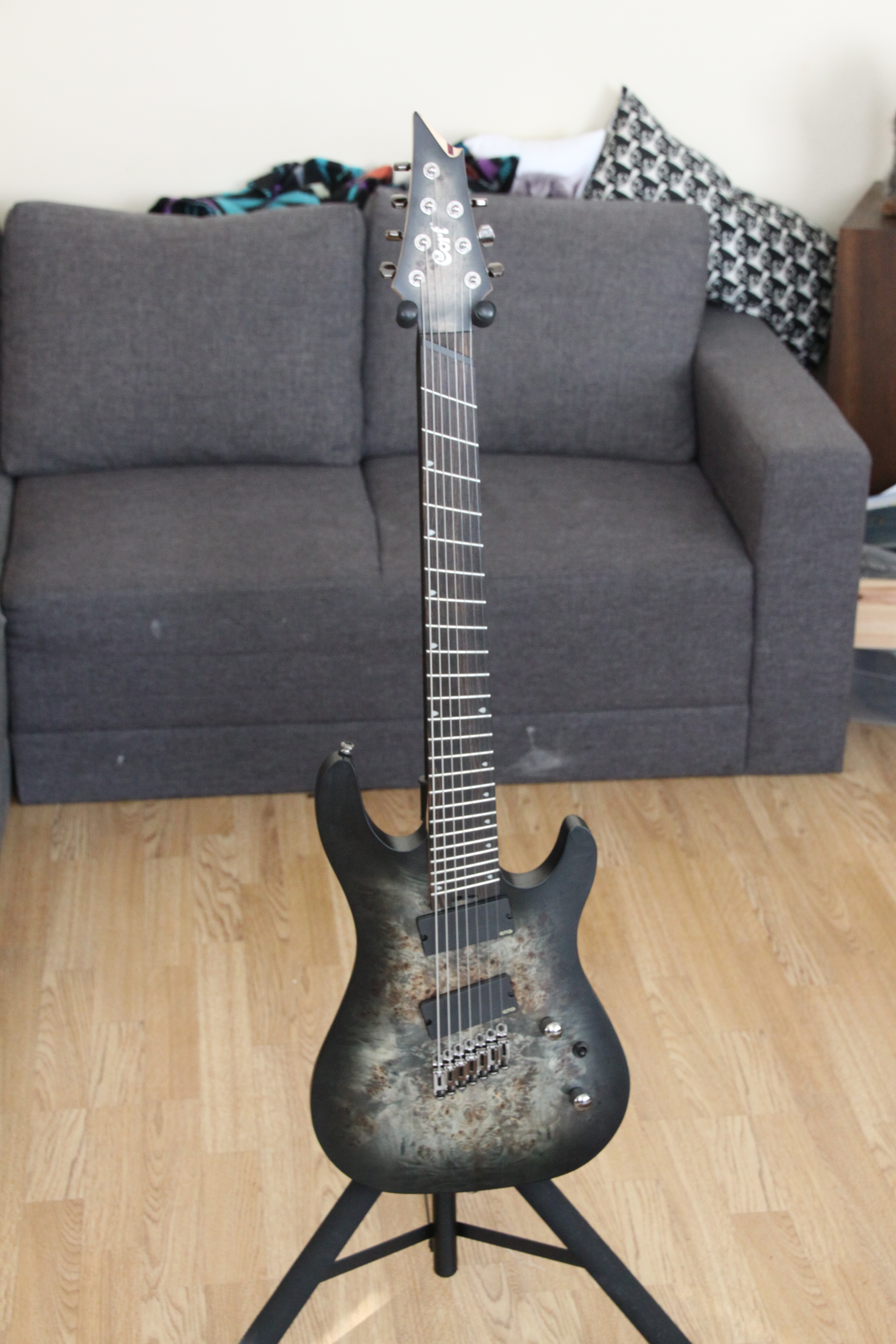
Cort KX500MS Star Dust Green -fanned fret / multi-scale -7-string electric guitar with EMG-pickups.

A multi-scale fingerboard (also called multiple scale length fretboard) is an instrument fretboard which incorporates multiple scale lengths. This allows each of the strings to have a different string tension and thus, balanced tonal characteristics.

The lowest string with the longest length can be strung at a higher tension compared to an equally scaled instrument of a comparable size and construction. The opposite is true with the highest string which experiences a lower tension. This system utilized in guitar fingerboards is identical to that of a piano soundboard and creates the same effect. The tighter lower strings can resonate with clearer lower overtones while the looser higher strings can freely create cleaner higher overtones.

Most modern guitars (and bass guitars) generally employ a single scale length for all of the instrument's strings, though the employed scale length can vary significantly between manufacturers (electric guitar scale typically falls between 24" and 25.5"). This measure is the effective length of each of the vibrating strings, not counting compensation for adjusting intonation.

A multi-scale fingerboard or fretboard is typically based on two scale lengths, but could potentially incorporate more. The most typical use is one (long) scale length for the low string and a different, usually shorter, scale for the highest string. This could be achieved by angling the nut, and bridge, and fanning the frets. Strings between the highest and lowest would also each have a unique scale length.

== History ==
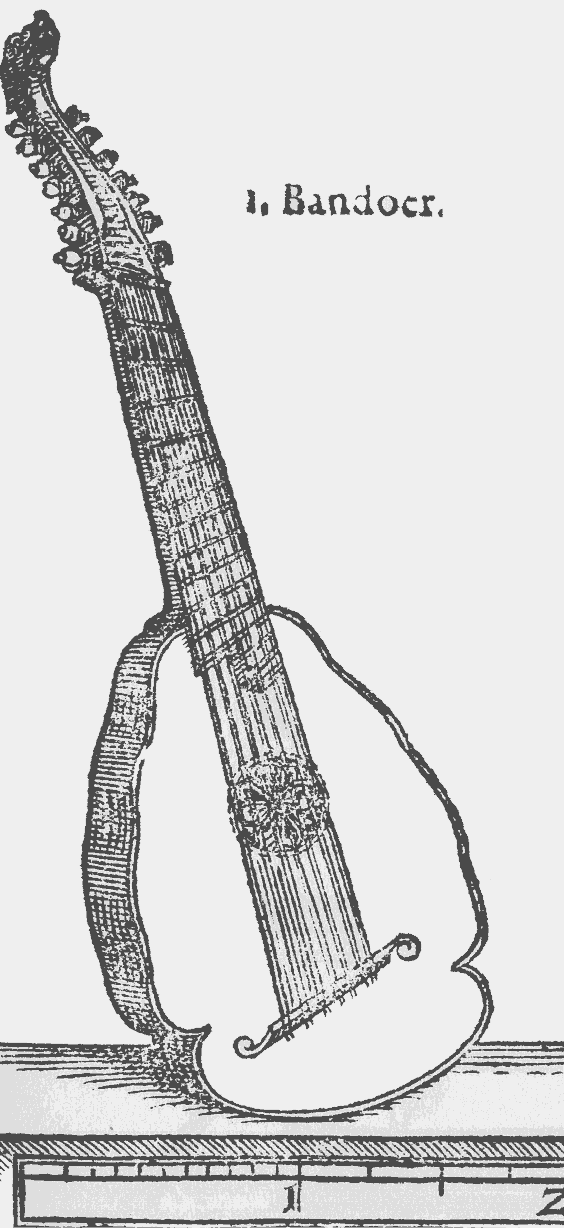
illustration of a bandora from Syntagma Musicum Theatrum Instrumentorum seu Sciagraphia, Wolfenbüttel, 1620CE.

The bandora is a late 16th-century instrument with a longer string length for its bass strings than for its trebles. It is depicted in Praetorius' music dictionary Syntagma Musicum published in 1619.

The concept of the multiscale fingerboard goes back to at least 1900, when the first patent for such a fingerboard was filed by E. A. Edgren. (Patent #652-353, E. A. Edgren)

In his 1900 patent Edgren describes in his claims: "… a musical instrument the combination with a sounding body or box, of the following instrumentalities, to wit: a neck approximately in the form of a double convex in cross section…" a plurality of frets secured to said neck, said frets being positioned at an angle one to the other so that the first and last frets incline in opposite directions "... it will be noted that the bottom flange of the head C runs at an angle so that one side of the neck B will be longer than the side opposite. The frets diverge, running from the center outward, so that the lower frets extend slightly in a direction opposite to the upper frets". This patent is no longer in force. When it was, it affected only instruments with a curved fingerboard, such as most steel-string guitars.

The first modern multiscale fretboard was used on an instrument called a StarrBoard, invented by John D. Starrett in 1977. Starrett developed a tapping instrument that employs a matrix of halftones, fretted horizontally with strings spaced vertically, to allow one fingering to cover all scales. Because of the large range of notes from low B on a 5 String Bass, to high B four octaves above, however, he needed a way to have a long scale for the low B, but a shorter scale for the high B. He simply laid out the two scales he thought would work and connected the dots.

The person generally credited with first using “fanned frets” on an electric guitar is Ralph Novak. In 1989 he was awarded the patent, which expired in 2008. Ormsby Guitars is credited as the first to use the name Multiscale, after creating a more accurate system for laying out the fretwork in non converging points. The expiration of Novak's patent and subsequent production of "multiscale" guitars by more companies has led to an increase in interest and sales of multiscale guitars overall.

== Fanned-fret guitar and bass guitar ==
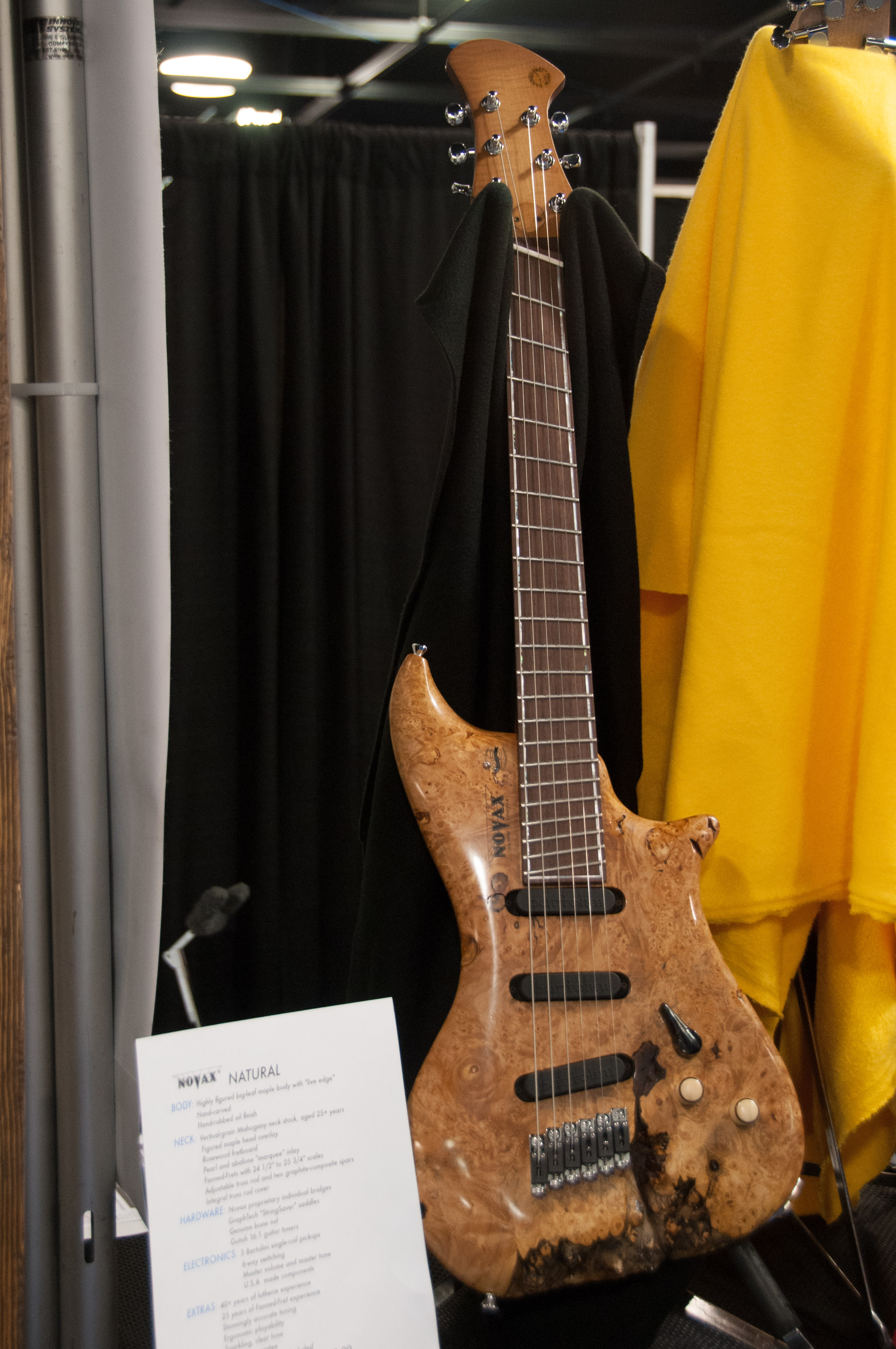
Fanned fret guitar

Fanned-fret guitars and bass guitars have a multi-scale fingerboard because of "offset" frets; that is, frets that extend from the neck of the guitar at an angle. Ralph Novak (Novax Guitars) was the first to apply this idea to the electric guitar (1988). The frets are arrayed on an angle, in contrast to the standard perpendicular arrangement of other guitars. Proponents of this style of guitar claim such benefits as comfort, better ergonomics, better intonation, and better control of the tension of the strings across the fretboard.

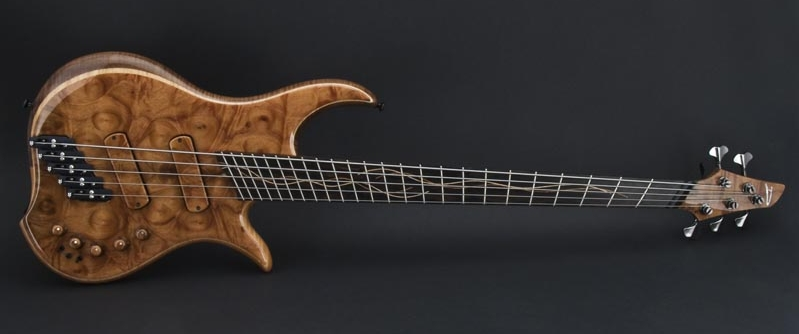
An example of a multi-scale 5-string bass guitar with fanned frets, made by Dingwall Guitars.

== See also ==
- Bandora (instrument)
- Orpharion, another early modern instrument, similar to the bandora
- Charlie Hunter, an American jazz guitarist who has performed and recorded with a "fanned-fretted", eight-string electric guitar
- Brahms guitar, an eight-string classical guitar with slanted frets, originally developed by guitarist Paul Galbraith and luthier David Rubio
- Gordon Giltrap
- Tosin Abasi
