= Brazilian Guitar Quartet =

The Brazilian Guitar Quartet was formed in 1998 to interpret the repertoire for four guitars and make transcriptions of works from diverse periods and styles. The Brazilian Guitar Quartet is composed of: Clemer Andreotti, Luiz Mantovani, Everton Gloeden, and Tadeu do Amaral.

Brazilian Guitar Quartet Discography
Title	Label
Bach: Four Suites for Orchestra	Delos International
Albéniz - Iberia	Delos International
Encantamento	Delos International
Essência Do Brasil	Delos International

== See also ==
- Brahms guitar
