= Nine-string guitar =

Fretted string instrument

A nine-string guitar is a guitar with nine strings instead of the commonly used six strings. Such guitars are not as common as the six-string variety, but are used by guitarists to modify the sound or expand the range of their instrument.

== Variants ==
There are two common variations of the nine string guitar:

=== Coursed strings ===
The first style is often employed with three pairs of coursed strings similar to a twelve-string guitar. Often the three wound strings are single and the three thin strings are doubled to six strings. This allows dry power chords on the lower three and a more atmospheric chorus sound when all strings are played. Some examples of this type of nine-string guitar are the Vox Mark IX and the Vox Phantom IX.

A different and rarer version of coursing uses doubled courses on the three bass strings, and leaves the high strings single. This facilitates free bending during solos, and slide playing. Mick Abrahams of the band Jethro Tull used this configuration (in open tuning) on the This Was album, though he achieved it by removing three of the top strings from an EKO 12-string acoustic-electric guitar, since stock nine-string guitars didn't exist at the time (1969). Some twenty years later, former Rollins Band guitarist Chris Haskett had a custom Paul Reed Smith nine-string guitar made in this configuration. The inspiration for the design was supposedly the desire to capture the prominent tonalities of a 6/12 doubleneck on a single-neck guitar.

=== Extended range ===
The second style expands on the seven- and eight-string guitar concept by adding either an additional lower- or higher-tuned string. When a lower string is added, the standard tuning becomes C#, F#, B, E, A, D, G, B, E. The scale is often lengthened, e.g., on the Ibanez RG9 (712 mm/28" instead of the common 25.5"). Tuning the highest string to an A4 or higher can be accomplished with a shorter scale length and/or a thinner string such as a .008 or .007.

Extended range nine-string guitars also sometimes have a multi-scale fingerboard design where the bass strings will be longer than the treble strings, which helps with proper intonation of the lower strings, improves string tension balance across the strings, improves harmonic overtones, overtone series, and inharmonicity.

== Notable nine-string guitarists ==
Notable guitar players of double-stringed nine-string guitars:

- Mississippi blues singer and guitarist Big Joe Williams spent most of his career playing nine-string guitars he had adapted himself from six-string instruments, with the first and second strings doubled in unison and the fourth doubled in octaves. His grave marker reads "King of the Nine-String guitar".
- Guitarist Matt Pike of Sleep and High on Fire also plays several First Act nine-string guitars.
- Nick Sadler, of the band Daughters, has played First Act nine-string guitars.
- Julian Cope played nine-string rhythm guitar during the 1980s, employing a standard twelve-string electric guitar but removing the doubled string on the bottom three courses.
- Experimental guitarist Cyrus Pireh uses a custom made 9 string Fender Esquire, removing the two high e strings and removing the doubled string on the low e string.

Notable guitar players of extended-range nine-string guitars:

- Mick Gordon used a Schecter nine-string for the Doom soundtrack; he would eventually admit that using a nine-string was "kinda stupid" in its excess, and that while he eventually sold the guitar to Fredrik Thordendal from Meshuggah, "even he can't find a use for it".
- After the Burial used Ibanez nine-string for their 3rd studio album Wolves Within.
- Tosin Abasi of Animals as Leaders uses a 9-string guitar in standard tuning for the song "Private Visions of the World".
- Stephen Carpenter of Deftones began using an ESP 9-string on their 2020 album Ohms.
- Rob Scallon plays a Schecter C-9 guitar on his songs "Envy" and "Royale".
- Joshua Travis plays a Legator 9-String Guitar in "I Dug A Grave".
- Lucas Mann of Rings of Saturn (band) also plays Legator 9-String Guitar.
- Andrew Baena

== See also ==
- Seven-string guitar
- Eight-string guitar
- Ten-string guitar
- Extended-range bass
- Brahms guitar
- Russian guitar
- Harp guitar
