= Ten-string guitar =

Musical instrument

A "guitar decacorde" ten-string guitar made by René François Lacôte in 1826

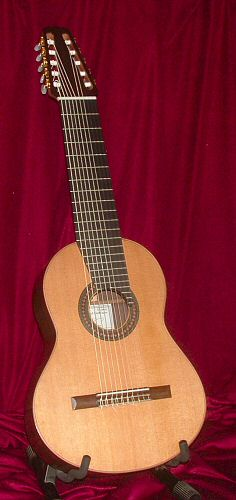
A classical ten-string guitar

There are many varieties of ten-string guitar, including:

- Both electric and acoustic guitars.
- Instruments used principally for classical, folk and popular music.
- Both coursed and uncoursed instruments.

== Uncoursed ten-stringed guitars ==
=== Yepes' ten-string guitar ===
The extended-range classical guitar is a classical guitar with additional strings, normally extra bass strings past the bass E string, that are available on the fingerboard.

Many configurations have been produced, but the ten-string classical guitar received a particular boost in 1964, when Narciso Yepes performed the Concierto de Aranjuez with the Berlin Philharmonic Orchestra , using a ten-string guitar invented by Yepes in collaboration with José Ramírez III, with a specific tuning designed to supply sympathetic string resonance to all twelve notes of the chromatic scale, in unison with any note played on the treble strings. This was significant for two reasons:

- The endorsement of an artist of Yepes' calibre drew attention to the instrument, and demonstrated its capabilities. Starting in 1963, and for the rest of his life, Yepes used only the ten-string guitar in recording and performance.
- The availability of high-quality ten-string classical guitars from the Ramírez Company allowed and encouraged other performers to investigate the instrument.

The use of the ten-string classical guitar is similar to that of the harp guitar:

- Six-string guitar music can be played on the first six strings, but with added resonance from the extra strings. This was Yepes' original intention and the reason for the design.
- Music specifically arranged for the instrument can make use of the extra strings directly, thus:
  - Music originally written for instruments with more than six strings can be more faithfully transcribed. Music written by Bach and his contemporaries for lute is of particular interest in this regard. The bass strings can be appropriately tuned.
  - New music specifically written for the ten-string guitar can make use of the extra strings however the composer might wish.

Unlike the harp guitar, the extended-range classical guitar has a single neck and allows all strings to be fretted.

While the six-string classical guitar remains the standard and most common instrument, since 1963 ten-string guitars in similar configuration to the original Ramírez have been adopted by many classical guitarists and produced by several first-class luthiers, using both Yepes' original tuning and others.

In January 2009, Gadotti Guitars announced the 10 String Nylon King Electric, a solid body, nylon-stringed ten-string guitar, suitable for both Yepes and other tunings such as the Baroque.

A ten-string jazz guitar by Mike Shishkov, based on the ten-string extended-range classical guitar, was demonstrated at the 3rd International Ten String Guitar Festival in October 2008.

=== Ten string electric guitar ===
These guitars are either custom-made or produced in small quantities due to the very niche market they are intended for. Most of these instruments are tuned like nine string guitars with either an extra High A string or an extra Low G# string, in that arrangement for the latter : G#, C#, F#, B, E, A, D, G, B, E.

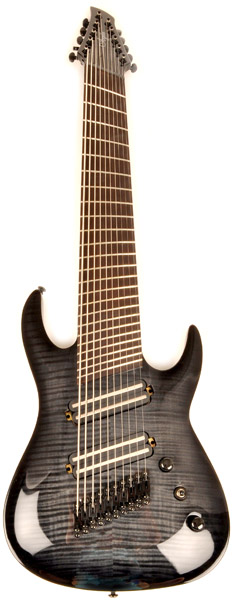
Ten string electric extended-range guitar.

== Five- and six-coursed guitars with ten strings ==
=== Baroque guitar ===
The baroque guitar is one of the earliest instruments considered a guitar, and the first to have significant surviving repertoire.

Surviving baroque guitars have (or originally had) nine or ten strings, in five courses. Stradivarius guitars (of which two, the Hill (1688) and Rawlins (1700) survive complete, plus a neck and several other fragments) all had ten strings in five courses.

=== English guitar ===
The English guitar is a type of cittern that was particularly popular in Europe from around 1750 to 1850. The English guitar has a pear-shaped body, a flat base, and a short neck. Its distinguishing feature is that it has ten strings in six courses, of which the highest eight are paired in four courses (duplicated strings) with the two lowest strings in two separate courses. This is the same stringing as was later used for the B.C. Rich Bich 10 Guitar, although the traditional tuning for the English guitar is a repetitive open C tuning (C E GG cc ee gg).

=== Viola guitar ===
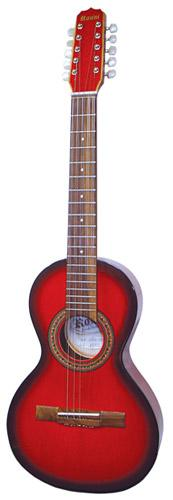
Viola guitar

The viola guitar is a guitar with ten light steel strings in five courses, played with the fingers rather than with a plectrum. It is particularly prevalent in the folk music of Brazil, where it's called "viola caipira" (country guitar) or simply "viola." The viola braguesa and viola amarantina are other types of ten-string Portuguese folk guitars, which are possibly predecessors of the Brazilian instrument.

=== Bich 10 ===
The initial B.C. Rich Bich design is a six-course instrument, with four two-string courses. The top E and B strings are strung as unison pairs, and the G and D strings as pairs with a principal and octave string, in the manner of the top four courses of a twelve-string guitar. The A and lower E strings are single-string courses. This unusual stringing was said to obtain the brightness of the twelve-string guitar, while allowing higher levels of distortion before the sound became muddy.

The Bich had a conventional six-string headstock for the six principal strings. The four additional strings are tuned by machine heads positioned in the body, past the tailpiece, with a large angled notch allowing access to the tuners. This radical body shape also countered the common tendency of coursed electric guitars to be head-heavy due to the weight of the extra machine heads.

One notable guitar player who played a 10-string Bich was Dave Mustaine who played one during his early professional years with Metallica. Mustaine only used the regular six string configuration on the headstock and never used the other four strings. Mustaine also played the guitar during the early years of his band Megadeth.

The design was moderately successful, but many players bought it for the body shape alone, and removed the extra strings. B.C. Rich eventually released six-string guitars with the Bich body shape. All Bich variants are hardtail guitars with through body necks and two humbucking pickups.

== Guitar-like instruments with ten strings ==
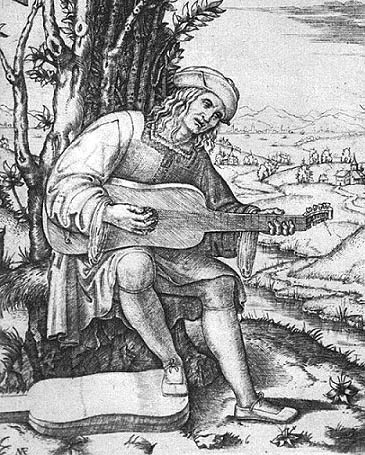
Vihuela de mano

Close relatives of the guitar with ten strings include:

- The vihuela de mano, an ancestor of the guitar, which had several variations including a five-course version.
- The Puerto Rican bordonua, a bass instrument most commonly having ten strings in five courses, although eight and twelve string versions also exist.
- The Puerto Rican Cuatro, with ten strings in five doubled courses.
- The North Mexican bajo quinto, which is a five-course bass instrument used in tejano and norteño music.
- The five-course charango and other members of its family (hualyacho, charangon, ronroco, et al) have ten strings. This a South American folk instrument appears from the front to be a small guitar. It has a bowl-back, traditionally made from an armadillo shell, though these days it is often a wooden bowl. These instruments are from the lute family, rather than the guitar family.
- The electric Chapman Stick, which may have eight, ten or twelve strings.
- The name cittern is given to a wide range of plucked instruments, including some modern guitar derivatives with ten strings.
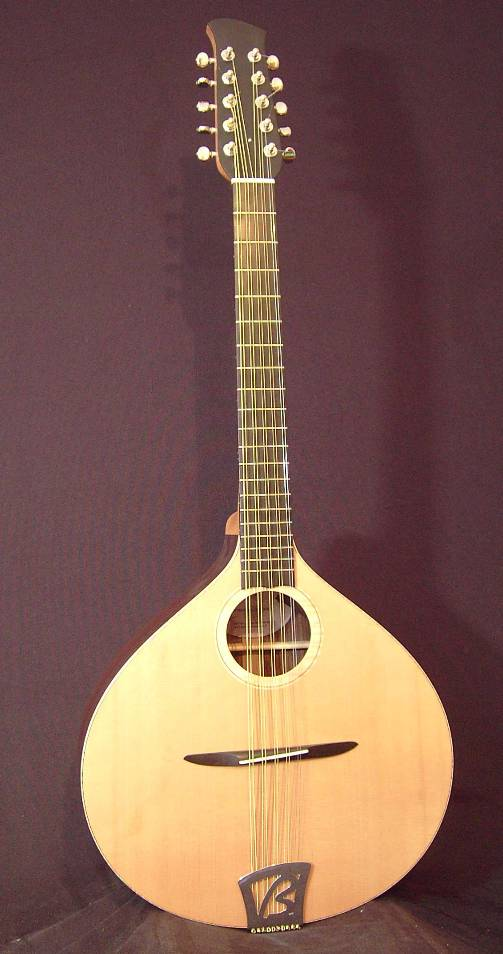
  Cittern

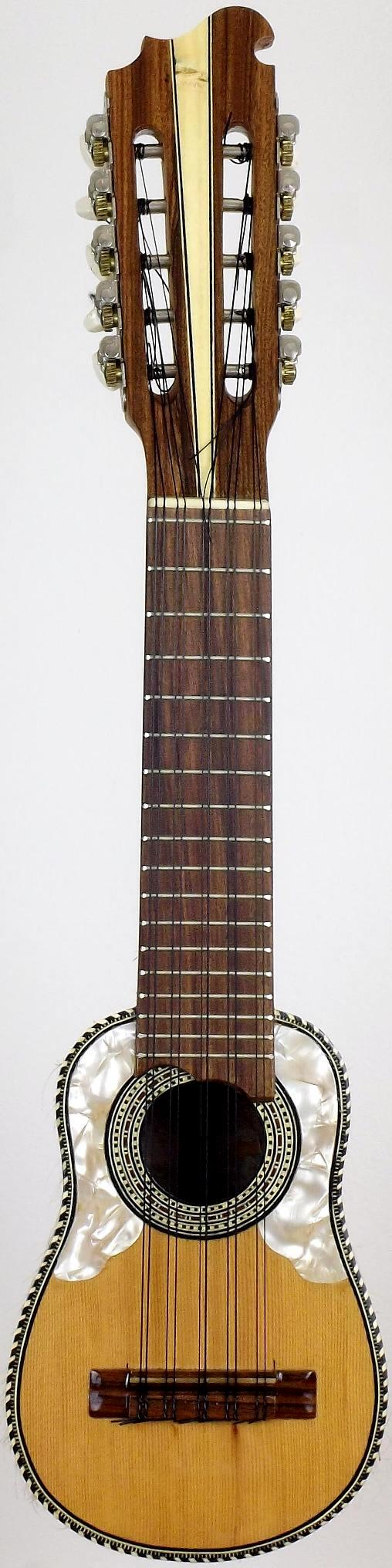
Charango

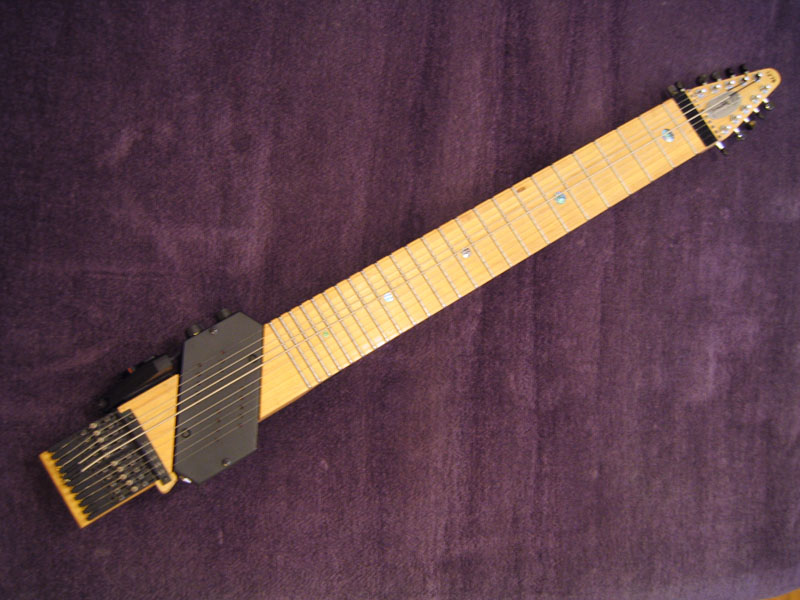
Ten-string Chapman Stick

== See also ==
- Seven-string guitar
- Eight-string guitar
- Nine-string guitar
- Extended-range bass
- List of extended-range guitar players
- Stradivarius#Guitars
