= Paul Galbraith =

Scottish guitarist

Paul Galbraith (born 18 March 1964) is a Scottish classical guitarist known for his unique style of playing.

== Biography ==
Paul Galbraith had his first guitar lessons with Graham Wade, continuing his studies with Gordon Crosskey at the Chethams School for Young Musicians. In 1980, he was a finalist in the BBC Young Musician of the Year competition. At the age of 17, Galbraith won the Silver Medal at the Segovia International Guitar Competition. Andrés Segovia, who was present, called his playing "magnificent." This award helped launch an international career including engagements with some of the finest orchestras in Britain and Europe (Royal Philharmonic, Chamber Orchestra of Europe, BBC Philharmonic, Scottish Symphony Orchestra, English Chamber Orchestra, BBC Scottish Orchestra, Scottish Baroque Orchestra, Ulster Orchestra, Hallé Orchestra and Scottish Chamber Orchestra among them). He toured the U.S. as soloist with the Moscow Chamber Orchestra, and performed in Prague's Dvorák Hall with the National Chamber Orchestra of Chile. His international touring has also brought him to Canada, Spain, Italy, Greece, Norway, Hungary, Brazil, China, India and Iceland.

Galbraith's unique playing position was first revealed at the Edinburgh Festival in 1989. His guitar (designed in collaboration with the late luthier David Rubio) is supported by a metal endpin, similar to that of a cello, that rests on a wooden resonance box. The instrument has two extra strings, in addition to those of a normal six-string guitar, one high (A string) and one low (A string).

Galbraith's CDs on the Delos label are the Bach Lute Suites, Paul Galbraith Plays Haydn (featuring Galbraith's arrangements of four keyboard sonatas), and "In Every Lake the Moon Shines Full"-folk tunes from many countries. Most recently, a CD of arrangements of piano music by Debussy and Ravel. Paul Galbraith's double CD of the Complete Solo Bach Violin Sonatas and Partitas (DE 3232) was nominated for a 1998 Grammy Award in the category of Best Solo Instrumental Album. This recording was also chosen as one of the two best CDs of 1998 by Gramophone Magazine, which called it "a landmark in the history of guitar recordings." This recording received a four star rating in Stereo Review, and reached the top 10 on the classical charts in Billboard Magazine.

Galbraith has been featured twice on National Public Radio's "All Things Considered" and numerous times on "Performance Today." He made his New York début at the Frick Collection, receiving a rave review in The New York Times; a subsequent NYC engagement on Lincoln Center's "Great Performances" series was sold out. Recent and forthcoming North American recitals include NYC, Boston, Washington DC, Los Angeles, San Diego, Atlanta, St. Louis, Albuquerque, Cincinnati, Cleveland, Portland, Eugene, Seattle, Miami, Baltimore, Buffalo, Amherst, Milwaukee, San Antonio, San Juan, Puerto Rico, and Cuernavaca, Mexico. In addition, tours of Great Britain, Spain, Portugal, Denmark, Germany, Italy, Hungary, and the Netherlands are among Mr. Galbraith's international activities. During the Bach Year (2000) he was featured artist at the Los Angeles, Philadelphia, Denver and Carmel Bach Festivals.

Recent orchestral engagements in the U.S. include concertos with the Indianapolis Chamber Orchestra, Knoxville Symphony, Santa Rosa Symphony and ProMusica Chamber Orchestra, among others. Galbraith and the St. Petersburg String Quartet gave the World Premiere in March 2003 at Stanford University of a new work, "Rhapsody for Guitar and String Quartet," that they co-commissioned from the acclaimed Georgian composer Zurab Nadarejshvili.

Galbraith has lived in Malawi, Greece, London, and, for the last ten years, Brazil. He was a founding member of the Brazilian Guitar Quartet, playing with them until summer of 2003. His principal teacher, since 1983, has been the Greek conductor, pianist and philosopher George Hadjinikos. Galbraith has lived in Brazil with his lutenist wife Celia, and their daughter Luiza since 1996.

== Discography ==
- 1998 Bach: The Sonatas and Partitas for unaccompanied violin COMPLETE
- 1999 Haydn Sonatas arr. for 8-String guitar
- 2000 Bach: Lute Suites
- 2001 In Every Lake the Moon Shines Full: Folk tunes from around the world
- 2006 French Impressions: Music of Debussy & Ravel
- 2010 Paul Galbraith Performs Mozart, Bach & Britten
- 2017 Allemande: Paul Galbraith Plays Bach and Mozart

== See also ==
- Brahms guitar
