= Seven-string guitar =

Fretted string instrument

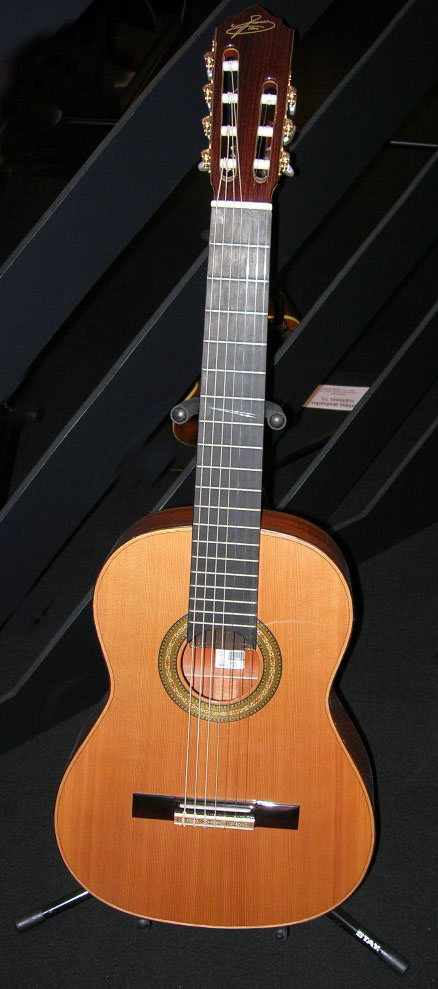
A Brazilian seven-string guitar

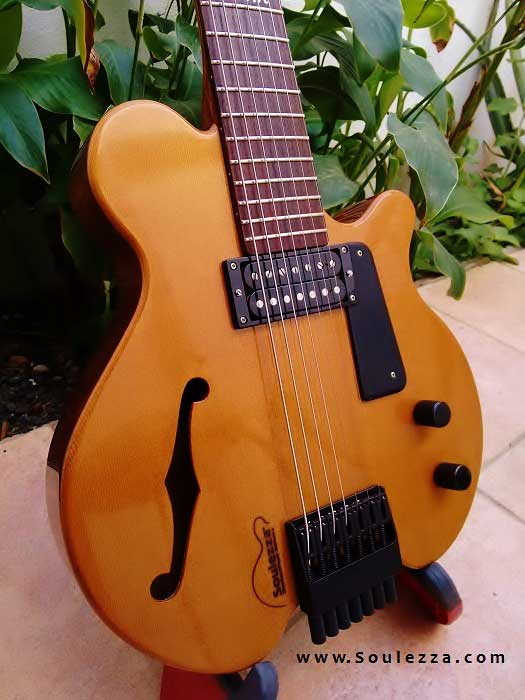
Soulezza 7 String Guitar

The seven-string guitar adds one string to the more common six-string guitar, commonly used to extend the bass range (usually a low B) or also to extend the treble range.

The seventh string is added in one of two different ways: by increasing the width of the fingerboard such that the additional string may be fretted by the left hand; or, by leaving the fingerboard unchanged and adding a "floating" bass string. In the latter case, the extra bass string lies next to the existing bass strings, but free of the fingerboard in similar fashion as the archlute and theorbo. Such unfrettable bass strings were historically known as diapasons or bourdons.

Some types of seven-string guitars are specific to certain cultures such as the Russian, Mexican, and Brazilian guitars.

== History ==
The history of the seven-string guitar stretches back more than 230 years. During the Renaissance period (c. 1400–1600), the European guitar generally had four courses, each strung with two gut strings, and the pair of strings within each course tuned in unison. By the mid-Baroque period (c. 1600–1750), it more commonly had five courses (still double-strung) and used a variety of tunings, some of them re-entrant. By the early 18th century, six double-strung courses had become common.

Up to this point, most stringed instruments were strung with gut strings. At around 1800, quality metal-wire strings became widely available. These new strings were more durable, remained in tune longer and, most importantly, produced a louder sound than the traditional gut strings. As use of metal strings became more widely adopted, their greater volume output impelled luthiers to experiment more with single-strung courses on their instruments and, in a relatively short time, the modern practice of using six single strings became first common, and then standard.

The changing number of courses in these early guitars may also illustrate an ongoing desire on behalf of players to increase the range of the instrument, a development similar to that gone through by the lute in earlier days. It is likely that all of these factors contributed to the development of the seven-string guitar, which has been around ever since. The seven-string guitar never became as widely accepted in Europe as the six-string instrument, but a number of composers did produce a significant body of work for the seven string. French guitarist Napoleon Coste (1805–1883) composed works with a seven-string guitar specifically in mind. The Italian guitarist Mario Maccaferri (1899–1993) was a celebrated advocate of bass strings (diapasons or bourdons) and also composed for the instrument.

By contrast, in Russia the seven-string guitar became widely popular, and entire schools of playing were developed around its use. Despite some brief setbacks in the mid-20th century, during which six-string instruments rose in prominence, the seven-string Russian guitar has remained popular in Russia to this day.

In the New World, a guitarra séptima or guitarra sétima—with fourteen strings, strung in seven double courses—has been known in Mexico since at least 1776 (Antonio Vargas). These instruments may still be found in use in Mexico, although the modern six-string instrument has become far more common. Seven-string instruments retain current popularity in parts of South America, notably Brazil, where they became an important instrument in the choro [es] music of the 19th century, which is currently experiencing a revival.

== Acoustic designs ==
=== Russian ===
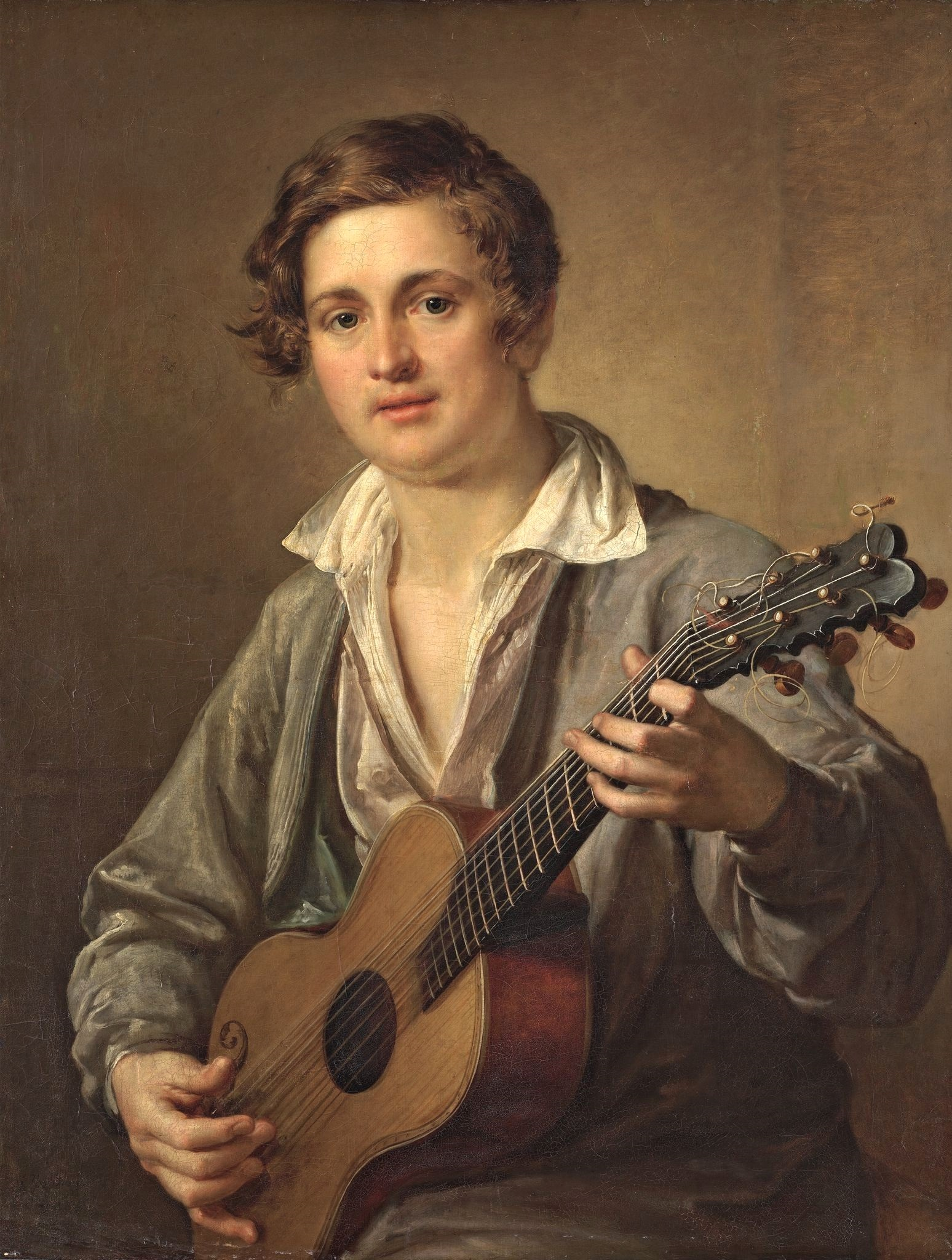
"The Guitar Player" by V.A. Tropinin (1823)

The Russian guitar or gypsy guitar is a seven-string acoustic guitar tuned to the open G tuning (DGBDGBD), which arrived or was developed early in the 19th century in Russia, possibly as a development of the cittern, the kobza and the torban. It is known in Russia as the semistrunnaya gitara (семиструнная гитара) or affectionately as the semistrunka (семиструнка).

Its invention was popularized by Andrei Sychra, who also wrote a method for the guitar, as well as over one thousand compositions, seventy-five of which were republished in the 1840s by Stellovsky, and then again in the 1880s by Gutheil. Some of these were published again in the Soviet Union in 1926. Andrei Sychra in his notation, marks with a number between 1 and 4 where to fret the 7th string with the thumb. Another way that Andrei Sychra took advantage of this guitar's innovation was through natural harmonics. Because of the three strings tuned to D, harmonics could be played in synchronization.

Early instruments used gut, and later silk strings; rarely wire. In the 20th century these instruments commonly used nylon strings, like western classical guitars, though by the last third of the century both nylon-strung "classical" and metal-strung "gypsy" versions of the instrument were both plentiful. Whatever material was used for stringing, the Russian guitar is traditionally played without a pick, using fingers for either strumming or picking. The origins of the 7 string most likely came from the English "guittar" popular in the late 18th century. The added string created an extra dimension for bass notes as well as opening up chord possibilities. The seventh string is also likely to have been influenced by the harp as it is meant to played arpeggiated. It also happens that the open D tuning was a perfect fourth lower than the six string tuning. The open D string tuning of this guitar was convenient for many Russian folk songs and dances that were typically within the major key. Along with the added interval possibilities came new techniques not previously seen with 6th string guitars.

The Russian version of the seven-string guitar has been used by professionals, because of its great flexibility and its sound, but has also been popular with amateurs for accompaniment (especially Russian bards) due to the relative simplicity of some basic chords and the ease of playing alternating bass lines. While greatly popular in Russia and Ukraine, this type of guitar has only recently been generating some interest outside of its traditional homeland.

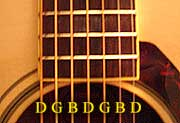
Tuning of the Russian guitar

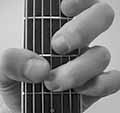
An F♯ major chord

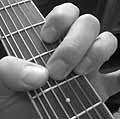
A B minor chord

The earliest music published for a seven-string guitar was in St. Petersburg, Russia, on 15 December 1798. The school was owned by Ignác František Held (1766, Třebechovice pod Orebem, Bohemia – 1816, Brest-Litovsk, Russia).

Standard tuning for the Russian guitar is: D2 G2 B2 D3 G3 B3 D4 with a very common "classical" variant being C2 G2 B2 D3 G3 B3 D4

Other tunings include:

- G C E G C E G ("Big guitar") (Open C)
- F B♭ D F B♭ D F (1/3rd guitar) (Open Bb)
- E A B D G B D
- E G B D G B D
- D G C D G B♭ D
- B F♯ B E A D F♯
- A E A D G B E
- A D G C F A D

=== Brazilian ===
Sofres porque queres
Example of seven-string guitar "baixaria" in the choro "Sofres porque queres" (Pixinguinha) recorded in 1919.

The Brazilian seven-string guitar (Portuguese: violão de sete cordas) is an acoustic guitar used primarily in choro and samba. It was introduced to Brazil in the late 19th century as a steel string guitar. The style of "baixaria" counterpoint and accompaniment technique was developed throughout the 20th century, especially by Dino 7 Cordas and Raphael Rabello. In the early 1980s, guitarist Luiz Otavio Braga had a nylon string version made, and this has become the norm for most contemporary solo musicians such as Yamandu Costa.

The Brazilian seven-string guitar is typically tuned like a classical guitar, but with an additional C below the low E as follows: C2 E2 A2 D3 G3 B3 E4; although some musicians tune the C down to a B resulting in: B1 E2 A2 D3 G3 B3 E4.

=== Classical ===
Seven-string guitarists are utilized in playing traditional and contemporary "classical" repertoire. These instruments are essentially nylon-strung classical guitars with one extra (usually) bass string, and the tuning is most commonly: B1 E2 A2 D3 G3 B3 E4. Aficionados of the instrument have produced many new arrangements, traditionally six-string classical guitar pieces, and the seventh string may be retuned—to C or D, for example—to accommodate these arrangements. The use of this instrument in the classical world, along with other extended range instruments having 8, 9, 10, 11, or more strings, has become common enough that several noted string manufacturers now produce and mark string sets specifically for seven-string classical guitars (La Bella; Pyramid; d'Aquisto; etc.). For example, Napoleon Coste arranged one of Franz Schubert's pieces for guitar and vocal accompaniment, despite guitars being typically for solo performance at the time.

=== Mexican ===
There is a guitar of seven pairs of strings, totaling 14 strings, known as guitarra séptima or the 14 String Guitar. The instrument is still played in Mexico and the USA by popular bands.

== Electric designs ==
=== Semi-hollow and hollow body electric guitars ===
In the United States, the jazz guitarist George Van Eps had a seven-string guitar built for him by Epiphone Guitars in the late 1930s and a signature Gretsch seven-string in the late 60s and early 70s. The Van Eps signature guitar may be the first regular-production seven-string electric guitar. Van Eps tuned his 7th string to A.

Several others began using seven-string guitars after Van Eps, including Bucky Pizzarelli, Howard Alden, Ron Escheté, Chance Russell, and John Pizzarelli, son of Bucky Pizzarelli. Lenny Breau also used seven string instruments, but whereas the other players all used instruments with an added bass string, Breau had at least one instrument in which the seventh string was an added treble string, tuned to the 'A' above the high 'E' string (A4). At the time he began using the high A string, no commercially manufactured string could withstand being tuned that high, so Breau substituted a piece of monofilament fishing line of appropriate gauge. A year later, advances in materials science allowed the La Bella company to begin manufacturing a custom string for Breau's high A.

Seven-string semi-acoustic archtop guitars were used by jazz-guitarist Ralph Patt after he began exploring major-thirds tuning in 1964. Patt's tuning is a regular tuning, in the sense that all of the intervals between its successive open strings are major thirds; in contrast, the standard guitar-tuning has one major-third amid four fourths. Major-thirds tuning has a smaller scope than standard guitar-tuning, and so Patt started using seven-string guitars, which enabled major-thirds tuning to have the E-e' range of the standard tuning. He first experimented with a wide-neck Mango guitar from the 1920s, which he modified to have seven strings in 1963. In 1967 he purchased a seven-string by José Rubio.

The first seven-string electric guitars were built in the "hollowbody" or "semi-hollow" archtop styles, where the guitar has a central resonating chamber, or a central block with resonant chambers on the sides. This gave the guitar the dark woodiness, breath, and richness that is associated with traditional "jazz" tone, but also made prone to feedback at high volumes, making it problematic for rock guitar playing.

=== Solid body electric guitars ===
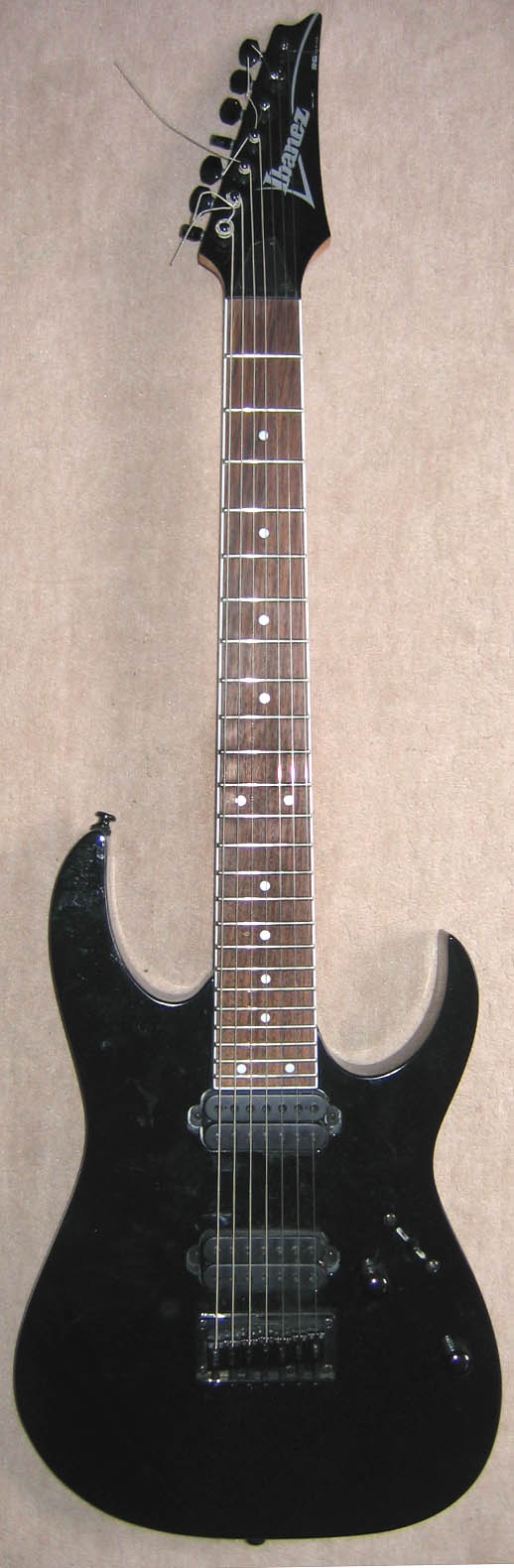
Seven-string electric guitar Ibanez RG7321

In the early thirties the National String Instrument Corporation offered seven-string versions of their solid-body lap-steel guitars.

A solid body seven-string electric guitar was conceived by guitarist Lenny Breau and built by luthier Kirk Sand, debuting at the 1983 NAMM Show, featuring a high A-string (rather than the low A-string of Eps). In 1987, Fender signed an agreement with Alex Gregory to produce a Stratocaster-style guitar that featured a high A-string. A small number of prototypes were made. However the unit was never put into production. He has made numerous false claims in regards to the 7 string guitar and is not considered a reliable source of information, even regarding his own 7 string signature series which was produced in limited numbers by Fender. He frequently embellishes the events that took place in all facets of its production.

The first mass-produced seven-string was the Ibanez UV7, a signature model for Steve Vai. It was also used by John Petrucci, Reb Beach, and Korn guitarists Brian Welch and James Shaffer, amongst others. Vai was drawn to the idea for much of the same reasons seven-string classical and jazz players were—the extended range the additional string offered. After initial experimentation with a high A, a low B was added as the high A proved to be too prone to breaking. (Kirk Sand and Lenny Breau solved the breaking high A string problem by shortening the scale length to 22.75", Vai's Ibanez is 25.5".) Vai began touring with Whitesnake with a seven-string prototype, and then used the guitars for his 1990 release Passion and Warfare.

The seven-string guitar became prominent when the band Korn featured Ibanez Universe guitars on their 1994 debut album. During the 1990s, manufacturers of 7-strings included Fender's subsidiary Squier and Gibson's subsidiary Epiphone.

In this time many guitarists were introduced to the extended range offered by a seven-string guitar. This was somewhat offset by a growing stigma that a seven-string guitar was a "nu metal" instrument, fit only for heavy riffing. This was ironic as Korn guitarists Munky and Head remember being told in their early days that the seven-string guitar could not be used for riffing, as it was a guitar for technical guitar players.

In the 1990s, several other heavy metal guitarists began using seven-string instruments (notably John Petrucci, Trey Azagthoth, and Erik Rutan), seeing the possibility for detuned riffing while preserving the full upper range of the guitar for solos. However, the seven-string guitar failed to really catch on at this phase in its development, and the Universe model was discontinued briefly in 1995. Historically, Matt Bellamy from Muse had used a custom red Manson seven-string to play just one song, "Citizen Erased", with a AADDGBE tuning (the song was originally recorded on a detuned six-string). However, he later started using new Manson custom seven-strings to play new songs "Supremacy", "Survival" and "Liquid State" on Muse's 2012 The 2nd Law album tour. Dino Cazares uses custom seven-string Ibanez guitars; Christian Olde Wolbers has his own signature Jackson seven-string guitar, Jeff Loomis has a signature model made by Schecter and Stephen Carpenter has several of his own models released by ESP.

== Hybrid designs ==
In the early 2000s, Roger McGuinn (renowned for his skills on the twelve-string guitar and for his long association with The Byrds) worked with C. F. Martin & Company to develop a seven-string folk guitar. McGuinn's guitar (currently being marketed by Martin) is tuned the same as a standard folk guitar with steel strings, but the third (G) string is augmented with a high octave string. Many of McGuinn's notable guitar solos utilize the G string of the twelve-string guitar to perform the main melody, and therefore the Martin seven-string guitar was designed to achieve this extended range playing without the need for doubling all six of the guitar's strings.

In 2010, Inox Guitars has created a mix of the Brazilian Viola caipira and the Russian semistrunka (семиструнка). This instrument has 2 bass strings (as the 6th and 7th strings of the semistrunka) and five treble courses (as the Viola caipira) and it is used in open tuning (GDGDGBD) as a slide guitar.

== Tuning ==
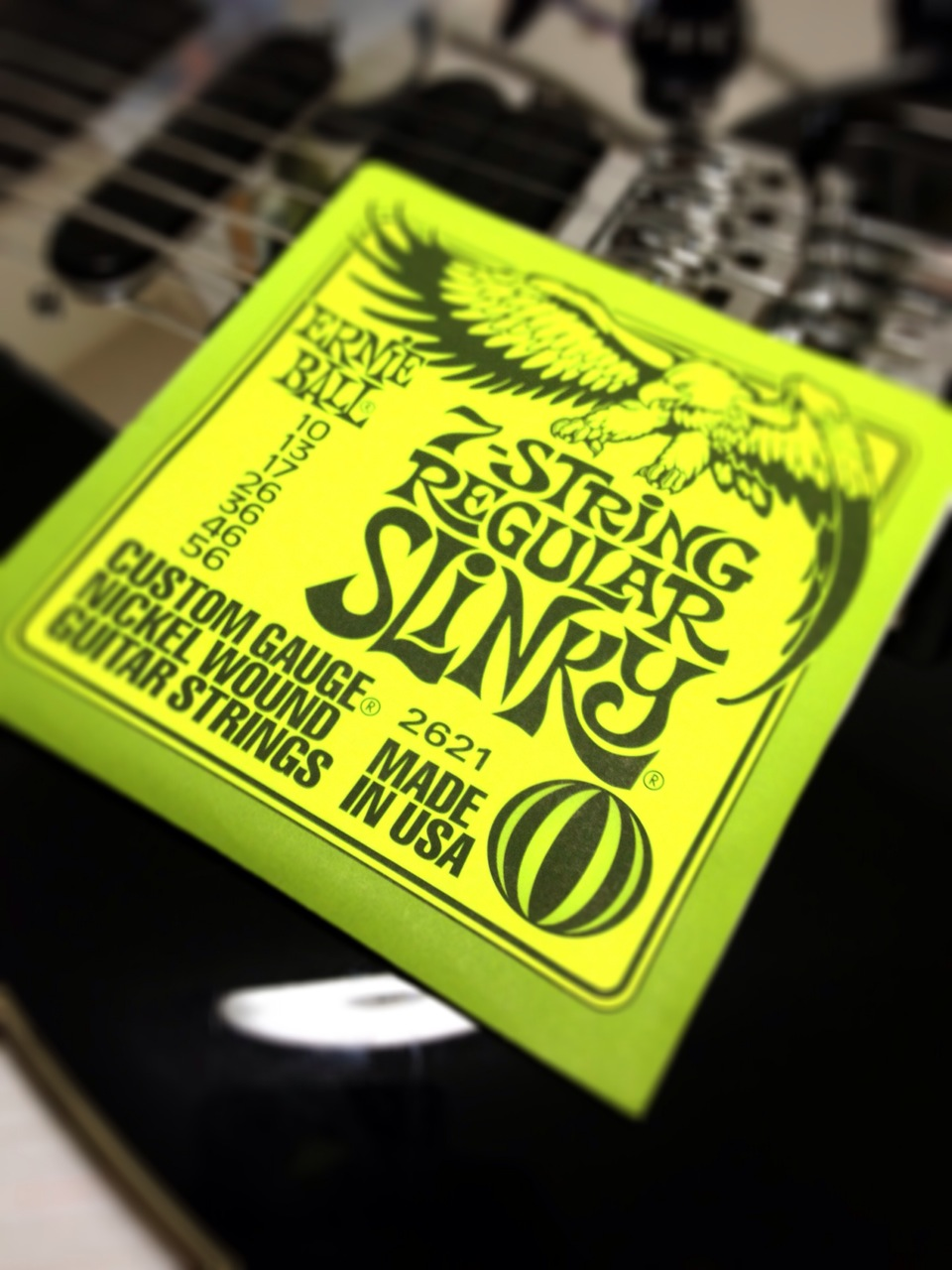
A pack of Ernie Ball electric guitar strings for 7-string guitars

The 7-string guitar of today is frequently tuned with a lower B on the added seventh string (B1–E2–A2–D3–G3–B3–E4). Modern metal bands such as Trivium (on The Crusade and Shogun), Dream Theater and Haken commonly use this tuning.

Many jazz musicians tune in dropped A tuning (A1–E2–A2–D3–G3–B3–E4) for improved bass lines and easier power chords. Choro players usually tune the seventh string up a half-step, to C: C2-E2-A2-D3-G3-B3-E4. The common Russian guitar tunings given above are still in widespread use. And players who prefer an added treble string (instead of an added bass string) usually tune: E2–A2–D3–G3–B3–E4–A4.

== See also ==
- Russian guitar
- Eight-string guitar
- Nine-string guitar
- Ten-string guitar
- Extended-range bass
- Harp guitar
- Chapman stick
- List of artists who use seven-string guitars
