= Brahms guitar =

8 String Classical Guitar

The Brahms guitar is a fan-fretted eight-string guitar that extends the standard six-string configuration by incorporating an additional lower bass string (B) and an additional higher treble string (A). The first Brahms Guitar was built in 1993 by the English maker David Rubio, from an idea of the Scottish guitarist Paul Galbraith. It was David Rubio that gave this guitar the name “Brahms Guitar” after hearing Paul playing his arrangement of Johannes Brahms Variations op.21a on this new instrument. David Rubio's protégé, luthier Martin Woodhouse, innovated the design and continues to build Brahms guitars. Galbraith originally conceived it specifically to perform Johannes Brahms' Theme and Variations, Op. 21.

The instrument adds two strings to the standard six—a low B (a 4th below the standard low E), and a high A (a 4th above the standard high E), giving B E A D G B E A. The guitar's frets are fanned to allow for the different string lengths. The Brahms Guitar was designed by David Rubio to be played in the traditional position and can be held like a classical guitar. Its pioneer, Paul Galbraith, at a young age, developed a unique technique while playing the standard 6-string guitar, allowing for greater freedom of the right arm. He held the guitar in a vertical position, initially sitting on the floor and later using an endpin like a cello. Paul adopted this technique with the Brahms Guitar as well, adding an external resonance box that enhances the instrument's resonance and provides a richer sound.

Other adopters include Giacomo Copiello, Gustavo Silveira Costa, Lucas de Almeida, Joseph Ehrenpreis, Aleksey Dukhovich, Yoni Garmider, Alan Guerreiro, Vincenzo Giura, Everton Gloeden, Spyros Kaniaris, Matthew Korbanic, Stanley Levi, Mettew Linder, Alf Wilhelm Lundberg, Luiz Mantovani, Redmond O'Toole, Rafael Ohira, Kyle Throw, Alexander Vynograd; and the formations Dúo Masciolick, Dublin Guitar Quartet, Brazilian Guitar Quartet, Progetto Zenobia.

In November 2020, Joseph Ehrenpreis released "New Music with Brahms Guitar, Vol. 1" funded by an IAS grant from the Illinois Arts Council. The project includes entirely new compositions from an international cast of composers, including Dai Fujikura, written specifically for the 8-string Brahms Guitar.

== See also ==
- Classical guitar making

== Sources ==
- Paul Galbraith's website
