= Koll Guitar Company =

American guitar manufacturing company

Koll Guitar Co.
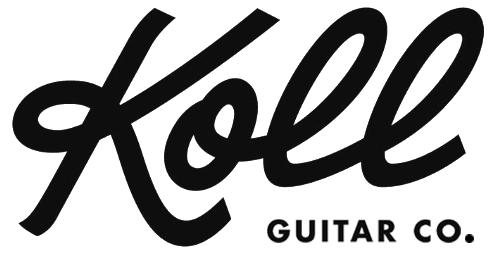
- Company type: Private limited liability company
- Industry: Musical instruments
- Founded: 1986; 39 years ago
- Founder: Saul Koll
- Headquarters: Portland, Oregon, United States
- Products: Electric guitars
- Website: kollguitars.com

The Koll Guitar Company is an American guitar manufacturing company based in Portland, Oregon. The company, established in 1986 by Saul Koll, produces electric and semi-acoustic guitars.

The company is known for its "Glide" series (which has had improvements such as the "Superior"), and for its experimental designs for musicians such as David Torn, Elliott Sharp, Henry Kaiser and Lee Ranaldo of Sonic Youth. Other models by Koll are the Troubadour and the Super Cub, designed in the 1950s style.

== History ==
Koll began playing guitar at the age of 12, and discovered Irving Sloan's book, Classic Guitar Construction, at a Southern California library. While attending college at San Diego State University, where he earned a Bachelor of Arts in sculpture, Koll began experimenting with guitar construction. After college, he began his professional luthier career at instrument repair shop, The World of Strings in Long Beach, California, where he was tutored by Jon Peterson and Glen Mers.

In 1986, Koll founded the "Koll Guitar Company" and subsequently relocated from Los Angeles to Portland, Oregon, where the company is currently based. Since 2015, most of Koll's guitars have been hand-built in-house by Saul Koll himself.
