= David Rubio =

British musical instrument maker

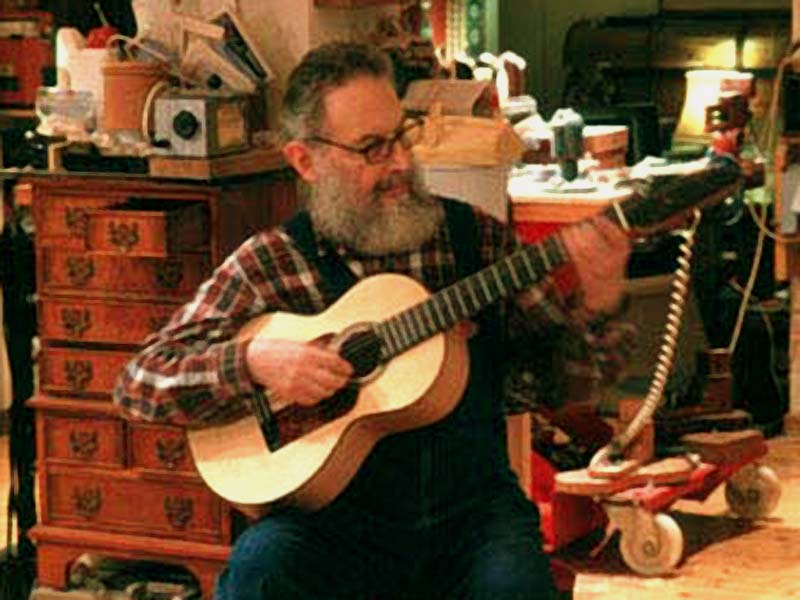
Rubio in his workshop in the 1990s

David Rubio (born David Joseph Spinks; 17 September 1934 – 21 October 2000) was an English maker of stringed musical instruments.

== Biography ==
David Rubio was born on 17 September 1934 in London, England. He acquired his new surname in his twenties while professionally playing flamenco guitar, which he had learned studying in Seville with, among others, the guitarist Pepe Martínez. In the early 1960s he traveled from Spain to New York as accompanist for the Rafael de Cordoba flamenco dance company. While in New York, Rubio abandoned playing in favor of the construction of guitars and established his first workshop on Carmine Street in New York's Greenwich Village. Eventually he returned to England and set up a workshop in Duns Tew near Oxford, later relocating it to Cambridge. Over time he expanded his repertoire to include the various other instruments mentioned above. Rubio investigated many aspects of the technology of instrument-making, in his attempt to re-create the classical sound and appearance of the old Cremonese instruments. Some of this work was published in Nature, following a collaboration with Professor Ralph Raphael and other Cambridge University scientists: they identified components used in the surface treatment of the wood of instruments made by Stradivarius and showed that a version of these substances could be used to improve the tone of modern instruments.

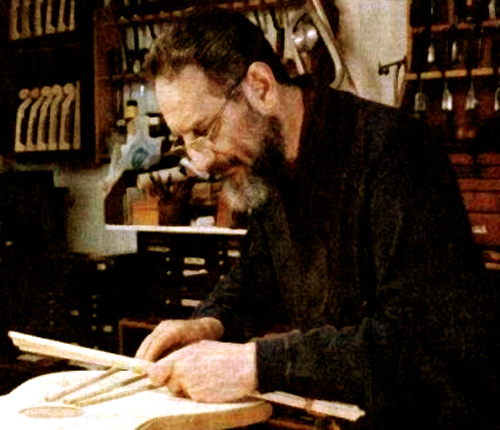
David Rubio in the 1990s

During his 40-year career Rubio created over a thousand instruments, which are coveted by players and collectors throughout the world. He also shared his expertise and knowledge with younger guitar makers. His creations included guitars, lutes, harpsichords, theorbos, vihuelas, citterns, panduras, and finally also violins, violas and cellos. His instruments were prized during his lifetime by many fine musicians, including the English lutenist and guitarist Julian Bream. The Rubio Quartet named themselves in his honour.

He died in Cambridge on 21 October 2000 aged 66.

== See also ==
- Brahms guitar
- Classical guitar making
