= Comma (music) =

Very small interval arising from discrepancies in tuning

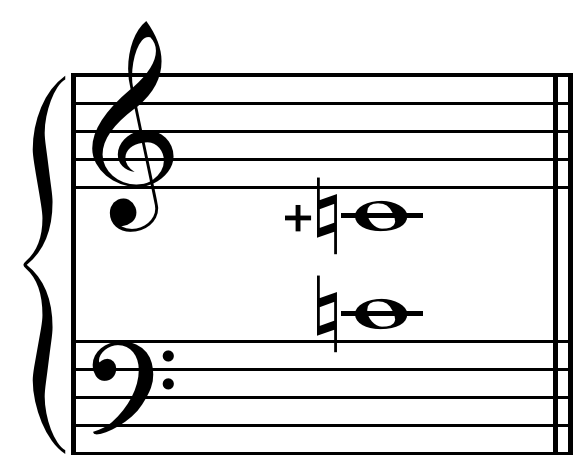
Syntonic comma on C

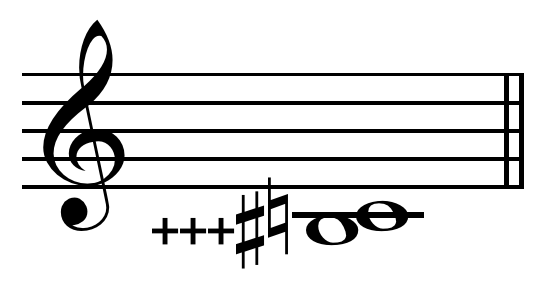
Pythagorean comma on C

In music theory, a comma is a very small interval, the difference resulting from tuning one note two different ways. Traditionally, there are two most common commata: the syntonic comma (81:80), the amount by which four just perfect fifths exceed two octaves plus a just major third; and the Pythagorean comma (531441:524288, approximately 74:73), the amount by which twelve just perfect fifths exceed seven octaves. The word comma used without qualification refers to the syntonic comma, which can be defined, for instance, as the difference between an F♯ tuned using the D-based Pythagorean tuning system, and another F♯ tuned using the D-based quarter-comma meantone tuning system. Pitches separated by either comma are considered the same note because conventional notation does not distinguish Pythagorean intervals from 5-limit intervals. Other intervals are considered commas because of the enharmonic equivalences of a tuning system. For example, in 53 TET, the harmonic seventh B♭ and A♯ are both approximated by the same interval although they are a septimal kleisma apart.

== Etymology ==
Translated in this context, "comma" means "a hair" as in "off by just a hair". The word "comma" came via Latin from Greek κόμμα, from earlier *κοπ-μα: "the result or effect of cutting".

== Description ==
Within the same tuning system, two enharmonically equivalent notes (such as G♯ and A♭) may have a slightly different frequency, and the interval between them is a comma. For example, in extended scales produced with five-limit tuning an A♭ tuned as a major third below C_{5} and a G♯ tuned as two major thirds above C_{4} are not exactly the same note, as they would be in equal temperament. The interval between those notes, the diesis, is an easily audible comma (its size is more than 40% of a semitone).

Commas are often defined as the difference in size between two semitones. Almost all of the meantone tuning systems produce two different characteristic semitones: A diatonic semitone for short steps in the scale, and chromatic semitone between a natural note, N♮, and its sharp, N♯. Their ratio (or in cents, their difference) is a comma; its size is unique to each meantone tuning. The same is true for Pythagorean tuning.

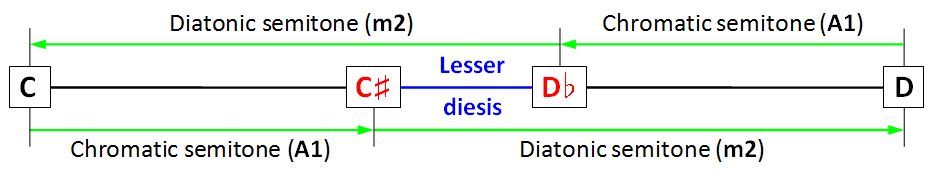
Lesser diesis defined in quarter-comma meantone as difference between semitones (m2 − A1), or interval between enharmonically equivalent notes (from C♯ to D♭). The interval from C to D is narrower than in Pythagorean tuning (see below).

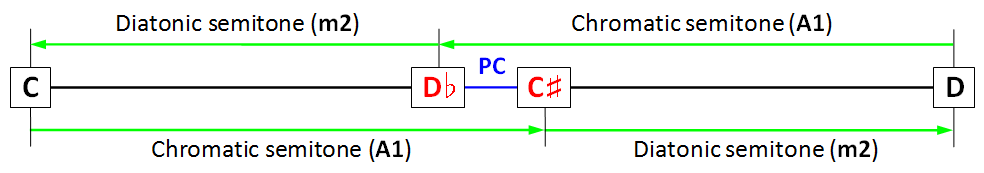
Pythagorean comma (PC) defined in Pythagorean tuning as difference between semitones (A1 − m2), or interval between enharmonically equivalent notes (from D♭ to C♯). The interval from C to D is wider than in quarter-comma meantone (see above).

In just intonation, more than two kinds of semitones may be produced. Thus, a single tuning system may be characterized by several different commas. For instance, a commonly used version of five-limit tuning produces a 12-tone scale with four kinds of semitones and four commas.

The size of commas is commonly expressed and compared in terms of cents – 1/1200 fractions of an octave on a logarithmic scale.

== Commas in different contexts ==
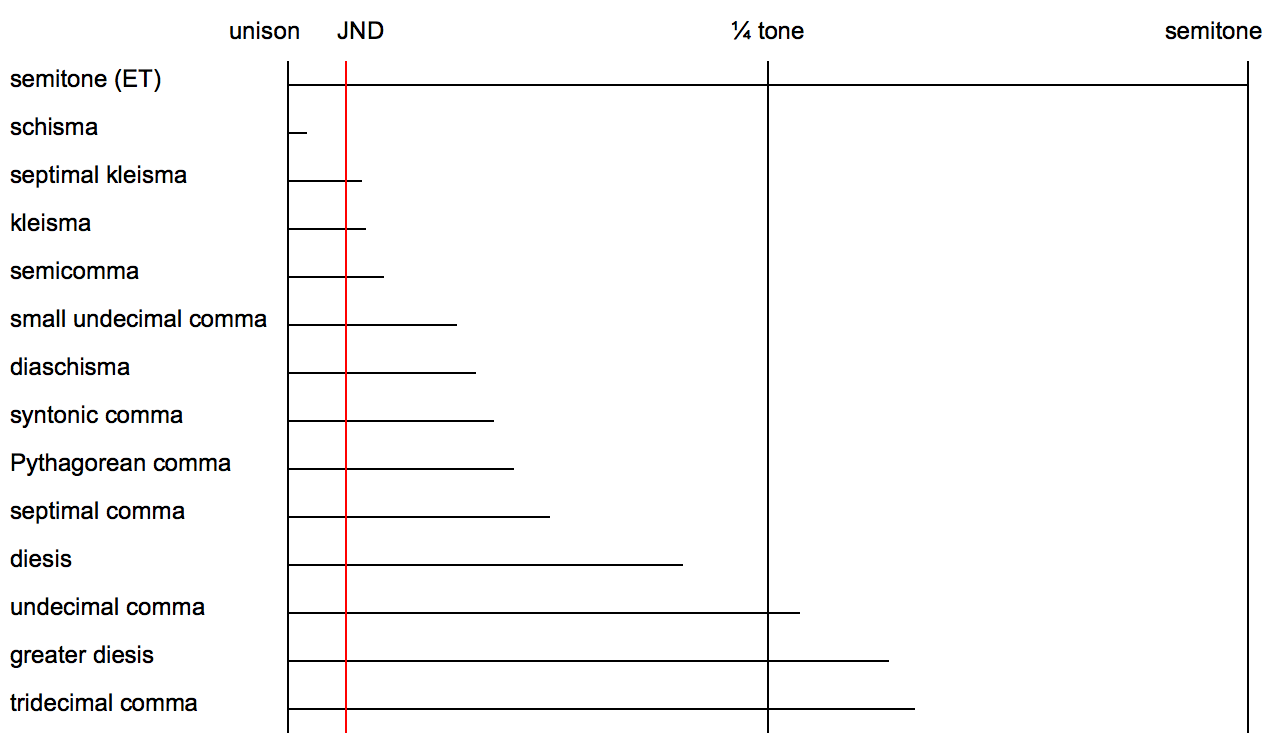
Comparison of the size of different commas, in cents. Equal-tempered semitone added for comparison. JND is the just-noticeable difference between tones.

In the column below labeled "Difference between semitones", min2 is the minor second (diatonic semitone), ^{aug}1 is the augmented unison (chromatic semitone), and S_{1}, S_{2}, S_{3}, S_{4} are semitones as defined here. In the columns labeled "Interval 1" and "Interval 2", all intervals are presumed to be tuned in just intonation. Notice that the Pythagorean comma (κ_{𝜋}) and the syntonic comma (κ_{S}) are basic intervals that can be used as yardsticks to define some of the other commas. For instance, the difference between them is a small comma called schisma. A schisma is not audible in many contexts, as its size is narrower than the smallest audible difference between tones (which is around six cents, also known as just-noticeable difference, or JND).

Name of comma	Alternative name	Definitions				Size	
Name of comma	Alternative name	Difference between semitones	Difference between commas	Difference between		Cents	Ratio
Name of comma	Alternative name	Difference between semitones	Difference between commas	Interval 1	Interval 2	Cents	Ratio
schisma	skhisma	^{aug}1 − min2 in 1/ 12 comma meantone	1 κ_{𝜋} − 1 κ_{S}	8 perfect fifths + 1 major third	5 octaves	1.95	$\tfrac{\ 32805\ }{ 32768 }$
septimal kleisma				3 major thirds	1 octave − 1 septimal comma	7.71	$\tfrac{\ 225\ }{ 224 }$
kleisma				6 minor thirds	1 octave + 1 perfect fifth ("tritave")	8.11	$\tfrac{\ 15625\ }{ 15552 }$
small undecimal comma				1 neutral second	1 minor tone	17.40	$\tfrac{\ 100\ }{ 99 }$
diaschisma	diaskhisma	min2 − ^{aug}1 in 1/ 6 comma meantone, S_{3} − S_{2} in 5-limit tuning	2 κ_{S} − 1 κ_{𝜋}	3 octaves	4 perfect fifths + 2 major thirds	19.55	$\tfrac{\ 2048\ }{ 2025 }$
syntonic comma (κ_{S})	Didymus' comma	S_{2} − S_{1} in 5 limit tuning		4 perfect fifths	2 octaves + 1 major third	21.51	$\tfrac{\ 81\ }{ 80 }$
syntonic comma (κ_{S})	Didymus' comma	S_{2} − S_{1} in 5 limit tuning		major tone	minor tone	21.51	$\tfrac{\ 81\ }{ 80 }$
53 tet comma (κ_{53})	Holdrian comma 1 step (in 53 tet)	1/ 9 major tone (in 53 tet)	1/ 8 minor tone (in 53 tet)	major tone (in 53 tet)	minor tone (in 53 tet)	22.64	$\bigl( 2 \bigr)^\tfrac{\ 1\ }{ 53 }$
Pythagorean comma (κ_{𝜋})	ditonic comma	^{aug}1 − min2 (in Pythagorean tuning)		12 perfect fifths	7 octaves	23.46	$\tfrac{\ 531441\ }{ 524288 }$
septimal comma	Archytas' comma (κ_{A})			minor seventh	septimal minor seventh	27.26	$\tfrac{\ 64\ }{ 63 }$
diesis	lesser diesis diminished second	min2 − ^{aug}1 in 1/ 4 comma meantone, S_{3} − S_{1} in 5 limit tuning	3 κ_{S} − 1 κ_{𝜋}	octave	3 major thirds	41.06	$\tfrac{\ 128\ }{ 125 }$
undecimal comma	Undecimal quarter-tone			undecimal tritone	perfect fourth	53.27	$\tfrac{\ 33\ }{ 32 }$
greater diesis		min2 − ^{aug}1 in 1/ 3 comma meantone, S_{4} − S_{1} in 5 limit tuning	4 κ_{S} − 1 κ_{𝜋}	4 minor thirds	octave	62.57	$\tfrac{\ 648\ }{ 625 }$
tridecimal comma	tridecimal third-tone			tridecimal tritone	perfect fourth	65.34	$\tfrac{\ 27\ }{ 26 }$

The syntonic comma has a crucial role in the history of music. It is the amount by which some of the notes produced in Pythagorean tuning were flattened or sharpened to produce just minor and major thirds. In Pythagorean tuning, the only highly consonant intervals were the perfect fifth and its inversion, the perfect fourth. The Pythagorean major third (81:64) and minor third (32:27) were dissonant, and this prevented musicians from freely using triads and chords, forcing them to write music with relatively simple texture. Musicians in late Middle Ages recognized that by slightly tempering the pitch of some notes, the Pythagorean thirds could be made consonant. For instance, if you decrease the frequency of E by a syntonic comma (81:80), C–E (a major third) and E–G (a minor third) become just: C–E is flattened to a just ratio of

$$\frac{\ 81\ }{ 64 } \cdot \frac{\ 80\ }{ 81 } = \frac{\ 1 \cdot 5\ }{ 4 \cdot 1 } = \frac{\ 5\ }{ 4 }$$

and at the same time E–G is sharpened to the just ratio of

$$\frac{ 32 }{\ 27\ } \cdot \frac{ 81 }{\ 80\ } = \frac{ 2 \cdot 3 }{\ 1 \cdot 5\ } = \frac{ 6 }{\ 5\ }$$

This led to the creation of a new tuning system, known as quarter-comma meantone, which permitted the full development of music with complex texture, such as polyphonic music, or melodies with instrumental accompaniment. Since then, other tuning systems were developed, and the syntonic comma was used as a reference value to temper the perfect fifths throughout the family of syntonic temperaments, including meantone temperaments.

=== Alternative definitions ===
In quarter-comma meantone, and any kind of meantone temperament tuning system that tempers the fifth to a size smaller than 700 cents, the comma is a diminished second, which can be equivalently defined as the difference between:

- minor second and augmented unison (also known as diatonic and chromatic semitones), or
- major second and diminished third, or
- minor third and augmented second, or
- major third and diminished fourth, or
- perfect fourth and augmented third, or
- augmented fourth and diminished fifth, or
- perfect fifth and diminished sixth, or
- minor sixth and augmented fifth, or
- major sixth and diminished seventh, or
- minor seventh and augmented sixth, or
- major seventh and diminished octave.

In Pythagorean tuning, and any kind of meantone temperament tuning system that tempers the fifth to a size larger than 700 cents (such as 1/ 12 comma meantone), the comma is the opposite of a diminished second, and therefore the opposite of the above-listed differences. More exactly, in these tuning systems the diminished second is a descending interval, while the comma is its ascending opposite. For instance, the Pythagorean comma (531441:524288, or about 23.5 cents) can be computed as the difference between a chromatic and a diatonic semitone, which is the opposite of a Pythagorean diminished second (524288:531441, or about −23.5 cents).

In each of the above-mentioned tuning systems, the above-listed differences have all the same size. For instance, in Pythagorean tuning they are all equal to the opposite of a Pythagorean comma, and in quarter comma meantone they are all equal to a diesis.

== Tempering of commas ==
Commas are frequently used in the description of musical temperaments, where they describe distinctions between musical intervals that are eliminated by that tuning system. A comma can be viewed as the distance between two musical intervals. When a given comma is tempered out in a tuning system, the ability to distinguish between those two intervals in that tuning is eliminated. For example, the difference between the diatonic semitone and chromatic semitone is called the diesis. The widely used 12 tone equal temperament tempers out the diesis, and thus does not distinguish between the two different types of semitones. On the other hand, 19 tone equal temperament does not temper out this comma, and thus it distinguishes between the two semitones.

Examples:

- 12 TET tempers out the diesis, as well as a variety of other commas.
- 19 TET tempers out the septimal diesis and syntonic comma, but does not temper out the diesis.
- 22 TET tempers out the septimal comma of Archytas, but does not temper out the septimal diesis or syntonic comma.
- 31 TET tempers out the syntonic comma, as well as the comma defined by the ratio 99/ 98 , but does not temper out the diesis, septimal diesis, or septimal comma of Archytas.

The following table lists the number of steps used that represent various just intervals in various tuning systems. Zeros indicate that the interval is a comma (i.e. is tempered out) in that particular equal temperament. For example, the zero in the row labeled $\tfrac{ 128 }{ 125 }$ and the column labeled 12 T EDO means that $\tfrac{ 128 }{ 125 }$ is represented with zero steps in 12 T EDO, making it a comma in that temperament. Because commas are often thought of as the ratio between two different ways to tune the same note and $\tfrac{ 128 }{ 125 } = \tfrac{ 2 }{ 1 } \div \left(\tfrac{ 5 }{ 4 }\right)^3$, so the fact that this corresponds to zero steps in 12 T EDO means that in 12 T EDO, $\tfrac{ 2 }{ 1 }$ is represented with zero more steps than (i.e., with the same number of steps as) three copies of $\tfrac{ 5 }{ 4 }$. (Specifically, 12 T EDO represents $\tfrac{ 2 }{ 1 }$ with twelve steps and each copy of $\tfrac{ 5 }{ 4 }$ with four steps.) Analogously, the 1 in the same row in the column labeled 19 T EDO means that 19 T EDO represents $\tfrac{ 2 }{ 1 }$ with one more step than three copies of $\tfrac{ 5 }{ 4 }$, the 2 in the same row in the column labeled 41 T EDO means that 41 T EDO represents $\tfrac{ 2 }{ 1 }$ with two more steps than three copies of $\tfrac{ 5 }{ 4 }$, and so on. Analogously, the -1 in the same row in the column labeled 5 T EDO means that 5 T EDO represents $\tfrac{ 2 }{ 1 }$ with one fewer step than three copies of $\tfrac{ 5 }{ 4 }$. Specifically, 5 T EDO represents $\tfrac{ 2 }{ 1 }$ with five steps and each copy of $\tfrac{ 5 }{ 4 }$ with two steps. Because $\tfrac{ 5 }{ 4 }$ is slightly less than $2^\tfrac{ 1 }{ 3 }$ but is represented in 5 T EDO by $2^\tfrac{ 2 }{ 5 }$, 5 T EDO's representation of $\tfrac{ 5 }{ 4 }$ is significantly sharper than the justly-intoned version, hence the -1. Thus, in 5 T EDO, going up by a factor of $\tfrac{ 128 }{ 125 }$ (e.g., from the representation of $\tfrac{ 2 }{ 1 }$to the representation of $\left(\tfrac{ 5 }{ 4 }\right)^3$) would require one to go down by one scale step.

Each of the frequency ratios in the first column are linked to its respective article.

Interval (frequency ratio)	5 T EDO	7 T EDO	12 T EDO	15 T EDO	19 T EDO	22 T EDO	31 T EDO	34 T EDO	41 T EDO	53 T EDO	72 T EDO
$\tfrac{\ 2\ }{ 1 }$	5	7	12	15	19	22	31	34	41	53	72
$\tfrac{\ 15\ }{ 8 }$	5	6	11	14	17	20	28	31	37	48	65
$\tfrac{\ 9\ }{ 5 }$	4	6	10	13	16	19	26	29	35	45	61
$\tfrac{\ 7\ }{ 4 }$	4	6	10	12	15	18	25	28	33	43	58
$\tfrac{\ 5\ }{ 3 }$	4	5	9	11	14	16	23	25	30	39	53
$\tfrac{\ 8\ }{ 5 }$	3	5	8	10	13	15	21	23	28	36	49
$\tfrac{\ 3\ }{ 2 }$	3	4	7	9	11	13	18	20	24	31	42
$\tfrac{\ 10\ }{ 7 }$	3	3	6	8	10	11	16	17	21	27	37
$\tfrac{\ 64\ }{ 45 }$	2	4	6	7	10	11	16	17	21	27	37
$\tfrac{\ 45\ }{ 32 }$	3	3	6	8	9	11	15	17	20	26	35
$\tfrac{\ 7\ }{ 5 }$	2	4	6	7	9	11	15	17	20	26	35
$\tfrac{\ 4\ }{ 3 }$	2	3	5	6	8	9	13	14	17	22	30
$\tfrac{\ 9\ }{ 7 }$	2	2	4	6	7	8	11	12	15	19	26
$\tfrac{\ 5\ }{ 4 }$	2	2	4	5	6	7	10	11	13	17	23
$\tfrac{\ 6\ }{ 5 }$	1	2	3	4	5	6	8	9	11	14	19
$\tfrac{\ 7\ }{ 6 }$	1	2	3	3	4	5	7	8	9	12	16
$\tfrac{\ 8\ }{ 7 }$	1	1	2	3	4	4	6	6	8	10	14
$\tfrac{\ 9\ }{ 8 }$	1	1	2	3	3	4	5	6	7	9	12
$\tfrac{\ 10\ }{ 9 }$	1	1	2	2	3	3	5	5	6	8	11
$\tfrac{\ 27\ }{ 25 }$	0	1	1	2	2	3	3	4	5	6	8
$\tfrac{\ 15\ }{ 14 }$	1	0	1	2	2	2	3	3	4	5	7
$\tfrac{\ 16\ }{ 15 }$	0	1	1	1	2	2	3	3	4	5	7
$\tfrac{\ 21\ }{ 20 }$	0	1	1	1	1	2	2	3	3	4	5
$\tfrac{\ 25\ }{ 24 }$	1	0	1	1	1	1	2	2	2	3	4
$\tfrac{\ 28\ }{ 27 }$	0	1	1	0	1	1	2	2	2	3	4
$\tfrac{\ 648\ }{ 625 }$	−1	1	0	1	1	2	1	2	3	3	4
$\tfrac{\ 36\ }{ 35 }$	0	0	0	1	1	1	1	1	2	2	3
$\tfrac{\ 128\ }{ 125 }$	−1	1	0	0	1	1	1	1	2	2	3
$\tfrac{\ 49\ }{ 48 }$	0	1	1	0	0	1	1	2	1	2	2
$\tfrac{\ 50\ }{ 49 }$	1	−1	0	1	1	0	1	0	1	1	2
$\tfrac{\ 64\ }{ 63 }$	0	0	0	0	1	0	1	0	1	1	2
$\tfrac{\ 531441\ }{ 524288 }$	1	−1	0	3	−1	2	−1	2	1	1	0
$\tfrac{\ 81\ }{ 80 }$	0	0	0	1	0	1	0	1	1	1	1
$\tfrac{\ 2048\ }{ 2025 }$	−1	1	0	-1	1	0	1	0	1	1	2
$\tfrac{\ 126\ }{ 125 }$	−1	1	0	0	0	1	0	1	1	1	1
$\tfrac{\ 1728\ }{ 1715 }$	0	−1	−1	1	1	0	0	−1	1	0	1
$\tfrac{\ 2109375\ }{ 2097152 }$	3	−2	1	2	−1	0	0	1	−1	0	−1
$\tfrac{\ 15625\ }{ 15552 }$	2	−1	1	0	0	−1	1	0	−1	0	0
$\tfrac{\ 225\ }{ 224 }$	1	−1	0	1	0	0	0	0	0	0	0
$\tfrac{\ 32805\ }{ 32768 }$	1	−1	0	2	−1	1	−1	1	0	0	−1
$\tfrac{\ 2401\ }{ 2400 }$	−1	2	1	-1	−1	1	0	2	0	1	0
$\tfrac{\ 4375\ }{ 4374 }$	−1	0	−1	1	0	1	−1	0	1	0	0

The comma can also be considered to be the fractional interval that remains after a "full circle" of some repeated chosen interval; the repeated intervals are all the same size, in relative pitch, and all the tones produced are reduced or raised by whole octaves back to the octave surrounding the starting pitch. The Pythagorean comma, for instance, is the difference obtained, say, between A♭ and G♯ after a circle of twelve just fifths. A circle of three just major thirds, such as A♭ C E G♯ , produces the small diesis 128/ 125 (41.1 cent) between G♯ and A♭. A circle of four just minor thirds, such as G♯ B D F A♭ , produces an interval of 648/ 625 between A♭ and G♯, etc. An interesting property of temperaments is that this difference remains whatever the tuning of the intervals forming the circle. In this sense, commas and similar minute intervals can never be completely tempered out, whatever the tuning.

=== Comma sequence ===
A comma sequence defines a musical temperament through a unique sequence of commas at increasing prime limits. The first comma of the comma sequence is in the q-limit, where q is the n‑th odd prime (prime 2 being ignored because it represents the octave) and n is the number of generators. Subsequent commas are in prime limits, each the next prime in sequence above the last.

== Other intervals called commas ==
There are also several intervals called commas, which are not technically commas because they are not rational fractions like those above, but are irrational approximations of them. These include the Holdrian and Mercator's commas, and the pitch-to-pitch step size in 53 TET.

== See also ==
- List of musical intervals
- List of pitch intervals
- Semicomma
