= Breedsma =

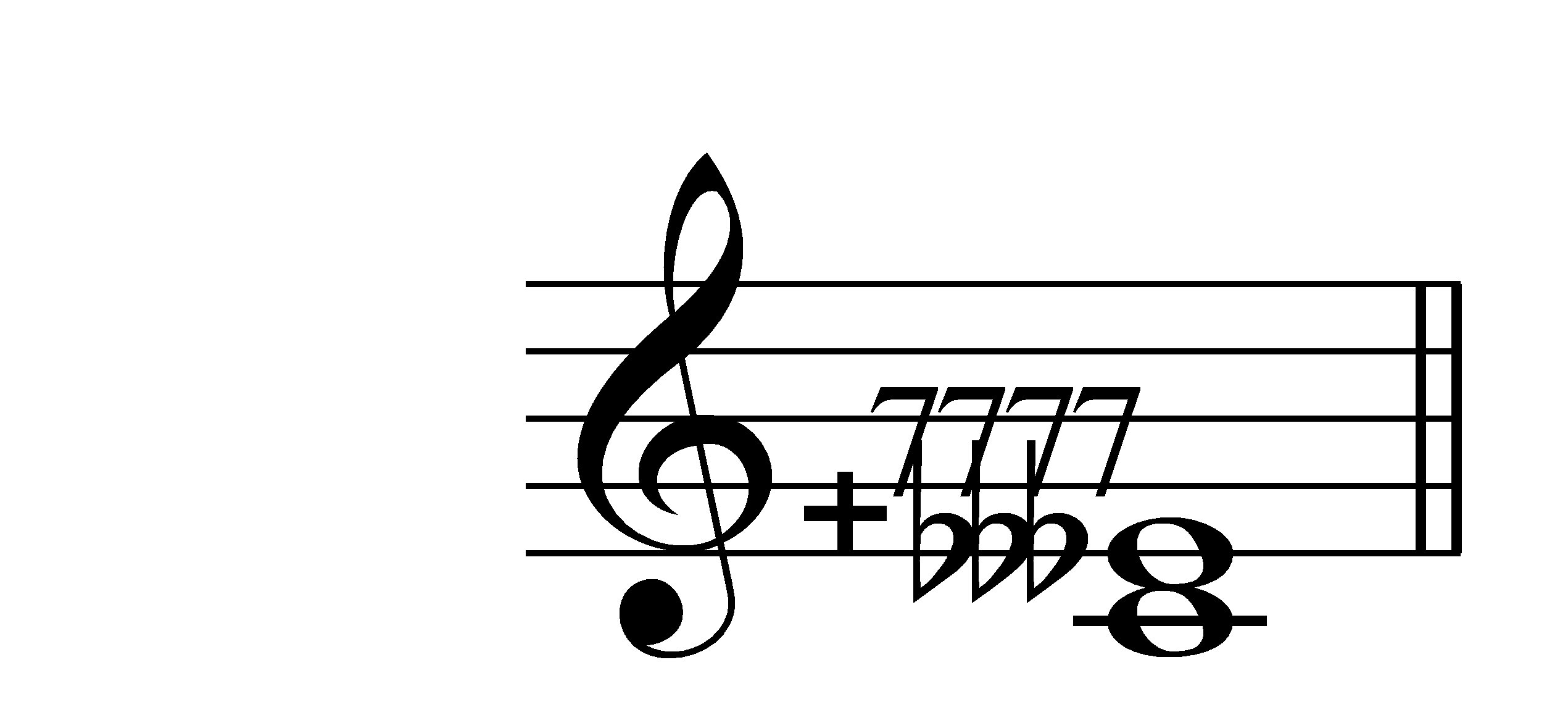
Breedsma

In music, a breedsma is an interval between pitches with the ratio of 2401:2400, which is the difference between the septimal diesis (49:48, also known as Slendro diesis) and the septimal sixth-tone (50:49, also known as jubilisma). It is about 0.72 cents.

2401/2400 = 128/75 / (8/7)^{4}
2401/2400 = (7/6)^{4} / 50/27

It is therefore the difference between one kind of classic diminished seventh and four septimal major seconds, or four septimal minor thirds and one kind of classic major seventh.

The equal temperaments with 27, 31, 41, 58, and 72 steps per octave all temper out the breedsma. Tempering out the breedsma divides the tempered chromatic semitone (representing 25:24) in half and therefore guarantees the presence of a neutral third which represents 60:49.
