= 41 equal temperament =

Musical tuning system

In music, 41 equal temperament, abbreviated 41-TET, 41-EDO, or 41-ET, is the tempered scale derived by dividing the octave into 41 equally sized steps (equal frequency ratios). Each step represents a frequency ratio of 2^{1/41}, or 29.27 cents, an interval close in size to the septimal comma. 41-ET can be seen as a tuning of the schismatic, magic and miracle temperaments. It is the second smallest equal temperament, after 29-ET, whose perfect fifth is closer to just intonation than that of 12-ET. In other words, $2^{24/41} \approx 1.50042$ is a better approximation to the ratio $3/2 = 1.5$ than either $2^{17/29} \approx 1.50129$ or $2^{7/12} \approx 1.49831$.

== History and use ==
Although 41-TET has not seen as wide use as other temperaments such as 19-TET or 31-TET, pianist and engineer Paul von Janko built a piano using this tuning, which is on display at the Gemeentemuseum in The Hague. 41-TET can also be seen as an octave-based approximation of the Bohlen–Pierce scale.

41-TET guitars have been built, notably by Yossi Tamim. The frets on such guitars are very tightly spaced. To make a more playable 41-TET guitar, an approach called "The Kite Tuning" omits every-other fret (in other words, 41 frets per two octaves or 20.5 frets per octave) while tuning adjacent strings to an odd number of steps of 41. Thus, any two adjacent strings together contain all the pitch classes of the full 41-TET system. The Kite Guitar's main tuning uses 13 steps of 41-TET (which approximates a 5/4 ratio) between strings. With that tuning, all simple ratios of odd limit 9 or less are available at spans at most only 4 frets.

41-TET is also a subset of 205-TET, for which the keyboard layout of the Tonal Plexus is designed.

== Interval size ==
Here are the sizes of some common intervals (shaded rows mark relatively poor matches):

interval name	size (steps)	size (cents)	midi	just ratio	just (cents)	midi	error
Octave	41	1200		2:1	1200		0
Harmonic seventh	33	965.85		7:4	968.83		−2.97
Perfect fifth	24	702.44		3:2	701.96		+0.48
Grave fifth	23	673.17		262144:177147	678.49		−5.32
Septimal tritone	20	585.37		7:5	582.51		+2.85
Eleventh harmonic	19	556.10		11:8	551.32		+4.78
15:11 Wide fourth	18	526.83		15:11	536.95		−10.12
27:20 Wide fourth	18	526.83		27:20	519.55		+7.28
Perfect fourth	17	497.56		4:3	498.04		−0.48
Septimal narrow fourth	16	468.29		21:16	470.78		−2.48
Septimal (super)major third	15	439.02		9:7	435.08		+3.94
Undecimal major third	14	409.76		14:11	417.51		−7.75
Pythagorean major third	14	409.76		81:64	407.82		+1.94
Classic major third	13	380.49		5:4	386.31		−5.83
Tridecimal neutral third, thirteenth subharmonic	12	351.22		16:13	359.47		−8.25
Undecimal neutral third	12	351.22		11:9	347.41		+3.81
Classic minor third	11	321.95		6:5	315.64		+6.31
Pythagorean minor third	10	292.68		32:27	294.13		−1.45
Tridecimal minor third	10	292.68		13:11	289.21		+3.47
Septimal (sub)minor third	9	263.41		7:6	266.87		−3.46
septimal whole tone	8	234.15		8:7	231.17		+2.97
Diminished third	8	234.15		256:225	223.46		+10.68
Whole tone, major tone	7	204.88		9:8	203.91		+0.97
Whole tone, minor tone	6	175.61		10:9	182.40		−6.79
Lesser undecimal neutral second	5	146.34		12:11	150.64		−4.30
Septimal diatonic semitone	4	117.07		15:14	119.44		−2.37
Pythagorean chromatic semitone	4	117.07		2187:2048	113.69		+3.39
Classic diatonic semitone	4	117.07		16:15	111.73		+5.34
Pythagorean diatonic semitone	3	87.80		256:243	90.22		−2.42
20:19 Wide semitone	3	87.80		20:19	88.80		−1.00
Septimal chromatic semitone	3	87.80		21:20	84.47		+3.34
Classic chromatic semitone	2	58.54		25:24	70.67		−12.14
28:27 Wide semitone	2	58.54		28:27	62.96		−4.42
Septimal comma	1	29.27		64:63	27.26		+2.00

As the table above shows, the 41-ET both distinguishes between and closely matches all intervals involving the ratios in the harmonic series up to and including the 10th overtone. This includes the distinction between the major tone and minor tone (thus 41-ET is not a meantone tuning). These close fits make 41-ET a good approximation for 5-, 7- and 9-limit music.

41-ET also closely matches a number of other intervals involving higher harmonics. It distinguishes between and closely matches all intervals involving up through the 12th overtones, with the exception of the greater undecimal neutral second (11:10). Although not as accurate, it can be considered a full 15-limit tuning as well.

=== Tempering ===
Intervals not tempered out by 41-ET include the lesser diesis (128:125), septimal diesis (49:48), septimal sixth-tone (50:49), septimal comma (64:63), and the syntonic comma (81:80).

41-ET tempers out 100:99, which is the difference between the greater undecimal neutral second and the minor tone, as well as the septimal kleisma (225:224), 1029:1024 (the difference between three intervals of 8:7 the interval 3:2), and the small diesis (3125:3072).

== Notation ==
Using extended pythagorean notation results in double and even triple sharps and flats. Furthermore, the notes run out of order. The chromatic scale is C, B♯, A/E, D♭, C♯, B, E, D... These issues can be avoided by using ups and downs notation. The up and down arrows are written as a caret or a lower-case "v", usually in a sans-serif font. One arrow equals one step of 41-TET. In note names, the arrows come first, to facilitate chord naming. The many enharmonic equivalences allow great freedom of spelling.

- C, ^C, ^^C/vvC♯/vD♭, vC♯/D♭, C♯/^D♭, ^C♯/^^D♭/vvD, vD,
- D, ^D, ^^D/vvD♯/vE♭, vD♯/E♭, D♯/^E♭, ^D♯/^^E♭/vvE, vE,
- E, ^E/vvF, ^^E/vF,
- F, ^F, ^^F/vvF♯/vG♭, vF♯/G♭, F♯/^G♭, ^F♯/^^G♭/vvG, vG,
- G, ^G, ^^G/vvG♯/vA♭, vG♯/A♭, G♯/^A♭, ^G♯/^^A♭/vvA, vA,
- A, ^A, ^^A/vvA♯/vB♭, vA♯/B♭, A♯/^B♭, ^A♯/^^B♭/vvB, vB,
- B, ^B/vvC, ^^B/vC, C

=== Chords of 41 equal temperament ===
Because ups and downs notation names the intervals of 41-TET, it can provide precise chord names. The pythagorean minor chord with 32/27 on C is still named Cm and still spelled C–E♭–G. But the 5-limit upminor chord uses the upminor 3rd 6/5 and is spelled C–^E♭–G. This chord is named C^m. Compare with ^Cm (^C–^E♭–^G).

Various 7-limit chords of 41-TET
Chord name	Chord	Notes	As harmonics or subharmonics	Homonyms
Sus4	C4	C-F-G	6:8:9	F sus2
Sus2	C2	C-D-G	8:9:12 or 9:8:6	G sus4
Downmajor or down	Cv	C-vE-G	4:5:6	
Upminor	C^m	C-^E♭-G	6:5:4	
Downminor	Cvm	C-vE♭-G	6:7:9	
Upmajor or up	C^	C-^E-G	9:7:6	
Updim	C^dim	C-^E♭-G♭	5:6:7	
Downdim	Cvdim	C-vE♭-G♭	7:6:5	
Downmajor7	CvM7	C-vE-G-vB	8:10:12:15	
Down7	Cv7	C-vE-G-vB♭	4:5:6:7	
Down add7	Cv,7	C-vE-G-B♭	36:45:54:64	
Up7	C^7	C-^E-G-^B♭	9:7:6:5	
Upminor7	C^m7	C-^E♭-G-^B♭	10:12:15:18	^E down6
Downminor7	Cvm7	C-vE♭-G-vB♭	12:14:18:21	
Downmajor6 or down6	Cv6	C-vE-G-vA	12:15:18:20	vA upminor7
Upminor6	C^m6	C-^E♭-G-^A	12:10:8:7	^E♭ downdim down7
Downminor6	Cvm6	C-vE♭-G-vA	6:7:9:10	vA updim up7
Updim up7	C^dim^7	C-^E♭-G♭-^B♭	5:6:7:9	^E♭ downminor6
Downdim down7	Cvdimv7	C-vE♭-G♭-vB♭	7:6:5:4	vE♭ upminor6
Up9	C^9	C-^E-G-^B♭-D	9:7:6:5:4	
Down9	Cv9	C-vE-G-vB♭-D	4:5:6:7:9	
