= 72 equal temperament =

Musical tuning system

In music, 72 equal temperament, called twelfth-tone, 72 TET, 72 EDO, or 72 ET, is the tempered scale derived by dividing the octave into twelfth-tones, or in other words 72 equal steps (equal frequency ratios). Each step represents a frequency ratio of ^{72}√2, or 16 2/3 cents, which divides the 100 cent 12 EDO "halftone" into 6 equal parts (100 cents ÷ 16 2/3 = 6 steps, exactly) and is thus a "twelfth-tone". Since 72 is divisible by 1, 2, 3, 4, 6, 8, 9, 12, 18, 24, 36, and 72, 72 EDO includes all those equal temperaments. Since it contains so many temperaments, 72 EDO contains at the same time tempered semitones, third-tones, quartertones and sixth-tones, which makes it a very versatile temperament.

This division of the octave has attracted much attention from tuning theorists, since on the one hand it subdivides the standard 12 equal temperament and on the other hand it accurately represents overtones up to the twelfth partial tone, and hence can be used for 11 limit music. It was theoreticized in the form of twelfth-tones by Alois Hába and Ivan Wyschnegradsky, who considered it as a good approach to the continuum of sound. 72 EDO is also cited among the divisions of the tone by Julián Carrillo, who preferred the sixteenth-tone (96 EDO) as an approximation to continuous sound in discontinuous scales.

== History and use ==
=== Byzantine music ===
The 72 equal temperament is used in Byzantine music theory, dividing the octave into 72 equal moria, which itself derives from interpretations of the theories of Aristoxenos, who used something similar. Although the 72 equal temperament is based on irrational intervals (see above), as is the 12 tone equal temperament (12 EDO) mostly commonly used in Western music (and which is contained as a subset within 72 equal temperament), 72 equal temperament, as a much finer division of the octave, is an excellent tuning for both representing the division of the octave according to the ancient Greek diatonic and the chromatic genera in which intervals are based on ratios between notes, and for representing with great accuracy many rational intervals as well as irrational intervals.

=== Other history and use ===
A number of composers have made use of it, and these represent widely different points of view and types of musical practice. These include Alois Hába, Julián Carrillo, Ivan Wyschnegradsky, Iannis Xenakis, and Tolgahan Çoğulu.

Many other composers use it freely and intuitively, such as jazz musician Joe Maneri, and classically oriented composers such as Julia Werntz and others associated with the Boston Microtonal Society. Others, such as New York composer Joseph Pehrson are interested in it because it supports the use of miracle temperament, and still others simply because it approximates higher-limit just intonation, such as Ezra Sims and James Tenney. There was also an active Soviet school of 72 EDO composers, with less familiar names: Evgeny Alexandrovich Murzin, Andrei Volkonsky, Nikolai Nikolsky, Eduard Artemiev, Alexander Nemtin, Andrei Eshpai, Gennady Gladkov, Pyotr Meshchianinov, and Stanislav Kreichi.

The ANS synthesizer uses 72 equal temperament.

== Notation ==
The Maneri-Sims notation system designed for 72 EDO uses the accidentals ↓ and ↑ for 1/12 tone down and up (1 step = 16 2/3 cents), and for 1/6 down and up (2 steps = 33 1/3 cents), and and for septimal quarter up and down (3 steps = 50 cents = half a 12-EDO sharp).

They may be combined with the traditional sharp and flat symbols (6 steps = 100 cents) by being placed before them, for example: ♭ or ♭, but without the intervening space. A third-tone may be one of the following ↑, ↓, ♯, or ♭ (4 steps = 66 2/3) while 5 steps may be, ↓♯, or ↑♭ (83 1/3 cents).

== Interval size ==
Just intervals approximated in 72 EDO. Note that any pitch must be within 8.3 cents of its nearest 72 EDO note.

Below are the sizes of some intervals (common and esoteric) in this tuning. For reference, differences of less than 5 cents are melodically imperceptible to most people, and approaching the limits of feasible tuning accuracy for acoustic instruments. Note that it is not possible for any pitch to be further than 8 1/3 cents from its nearest 72 EDO note, since the step size between them is 16 2/3 cents. Hence for the sake of comparison, pitch errors of about 8 cents are (for this fine a tuning) poorly matched, whereas the practical limit for tuning any acoustical instrument is at best about 2 cents, which would be very good match in the table – this even applies to electronic instruments if they produce notes that show any audible trace of vibrato.

Interval name	Size (steps)	Size (cents)	MIDI audio	Just ratio	Just (cents)	MIDI audio	Error
octave	72	1200		2:1	1200		0
harmonic seventh	58	966.67		7:4	968.83		−2.16
perfect fifth	42	700		3:2	701.96		−1.96
septendecimal tritone	36	600		17:12	603.00		−3.00
septimal tritone	35	583.33		7:5	582.51		+0.82
tridecimal tritone	34	566.67		18:13	563.38		+3.28
eleventh harmonic	33	550		11:8	551.32		−1.32
(15:11) augmented fourth	32	533.33		15:11	536.95		−3.62
perfect fourth	30	500		4:3	498.04		+1.96
septimal narrow fourth	28	466.66		21:16	470.78		−4.11
17:13 narrow fourth	28	466.66		17:13	464.43		+2.24
tridecimal major third	27	450		13:10	454.21		−4.21
septendecimal supermajor third	27	450		22:17	446.36		+3.64
septimal major third	26	433.33		9:7	435.08		−1.75
undecimal major third	25	416.67		14:11	417.51		−0.84
quasi-tempered major third	24	400		5:4	386.31		13.69
major third	23	383.33		5:4	386.31		−2.98
tridecimal neutral third	22	366.67		16:13	359.47		+7.19
neutral third	21	350		11:9	347.41		+2.59
septendecimal supraminor third	20	333.33		17:14	336.13		−2.80
minor third	19	316.67		6:5	315.64		+1.03
quasi-tempered minor third	18	300		25:21	301.85		−1.85
tridecimal minor third	17	283.33		13:11	289.21		−5.88
septimal minor third	16	266.67		7:6	266.87		−0.20
tridecimal tone-and-a-quarter	15	250		15:13	247.74		+2.26
septimal whole tone	14	233.33		8:7	231.17		+2.16
septendecimal whole tone	13	216.67		17:15	216.69		−0.02
whole tone, major tone	12	200		9:8	203.91		−3.91
whole tone, minor tone	11	183.33		10:9	182.40		+0.93
greater undecimal neutral second	10	166.67		11:10	165.00		+1.66
lesser undecimal neutral second	9	150		12:11	150.64		−0.64
greater tridecimal two-third tone	8	133.33		13:12	138.57		−5.24
great limma	8	133.33		27:25	133.24		+0.09
lesser tridecimal two-third tone	8	133.33		14:13	128.30		+5.04
septimal diatonic semitone	7	116.67		15:14	119.44		−2.78
diatonic semitone	7	116.67		16:15	111.73		+4.94
greater septendecimal semitone	6	100		17:16	104.95		−4.95
lesser septendecimal semitone	6	100		18:17	98.95		+1.05
septimal chromatic semitone	5	83.33		21:20	84.47		−1.13
chromatic semitone	4	66.67		25:24	70.67		−4.01
septimal third-tone	4	66.67		28:27	62.96		+3.71
septimal quarter tone	3	50		36:35	48.77		+1.23
septimal diesis	2	33.33		49:48	35.70		−2.36
undecimal comma	1	16.67		100:99	17.40		−0.73

- contrast with just diatonic scale
- contrast with diatonic scale in 12 EDO

Although 12 EDO can be viewed as a subset of 72 EDO, the closest matches to most commonly used intervals under 72 EDO are distinct from the closest matches under 12 EDO. For example, the major third of 12 EDO, which is sharp, exists as the 24 step interval within 72 EDO, but the 23 step interval is a much closer match to the 5:4 ratio of the just major third.

12 EDO has a very good approximation for the perfect fifth (third harmonic), especially for such a small number of steps per octave, but compared to the equally-tempered versions in 12 EDO, the just major third (fifth harmonic) is off by about a sixth of a step, the seventh harmonic is off by about a third of a step, and the eleventh harmonic is off by about half of a step. This suggests that if each step of 12 EDO were divided in six, the fifth, seventh, and eleventh harmonics would now be well-approximated, while 12 EDO‑s excellent approximation of the third harmonic would be retained. Indeed, all intervals involving harmonics up through the 11th are matched very closely in 72 EDO; no intervals formed as the difference of any two of these intervals are tempered out by this tuning system. Thus, 72 EDO can be seen as offering an almost perfect approximation to 7-, 9-, and 11 limit music. When it comes to the higher harmonics, a number of intervals are still matched quite well, but some are tempered out. For instance, the comma 169:168 is tempered out, but other intervals involving the thirteenth harmonic are distinguished.

Unlike tunings such as 31 EDO and 41 EDO, 72 EDO contains many intervals which do not closely match any small-number (up to 16) harmonics in the harmonic series.

== Scale diagram ==
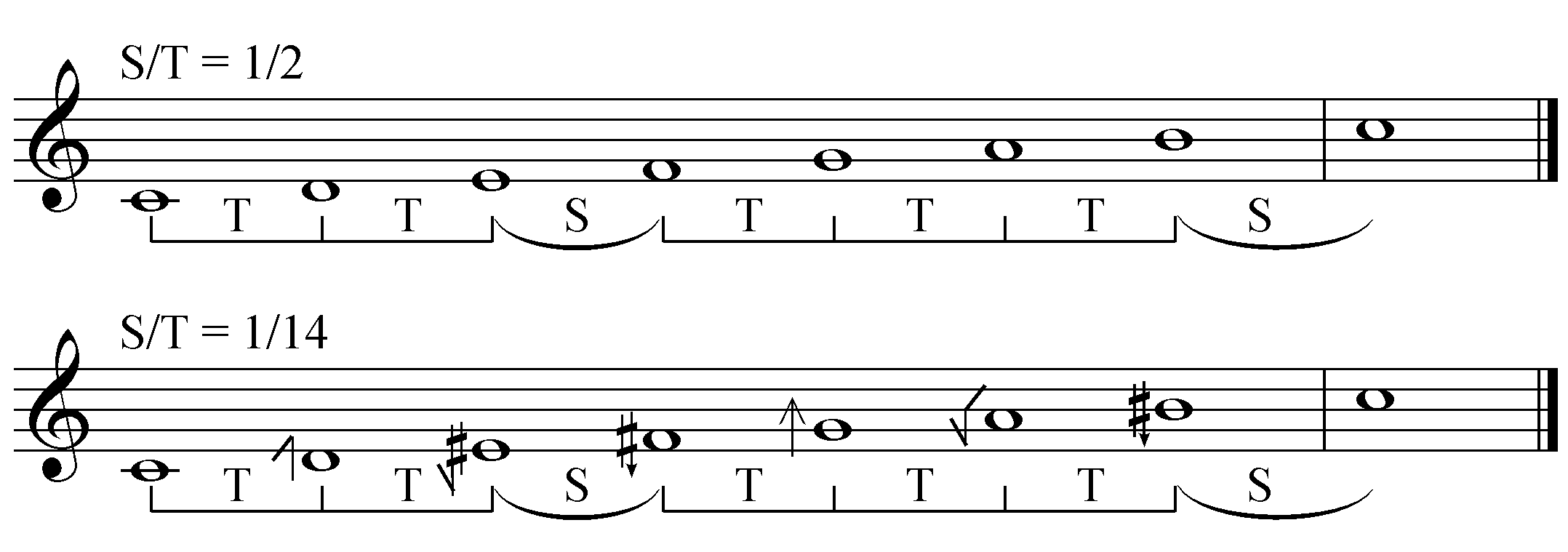
12 tone and 72 tone regular diatonic scales notated with the Maneri-Sims system

Because 72 EDO contains 12 EDO, the scale of 12 EDO is in 72 EDO. However, the true scale can be approximated better by other intervals.

== See also ==
- Varieties of equal temperament
