= 15 equal temperament =

Musical tuning system with 15 pitches equally-spaced on a logarithmic scale

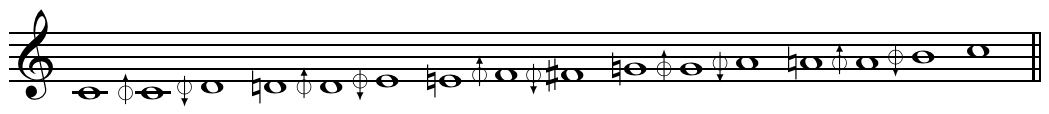
Easley Blackwood's notation system for 15 equal temperament: intervals are notated similarly to those they approximate and there are different enharmonic equivalents (e.g., up-G = up-A-flat).

Downmajor scale on C in 15 equal temperament.

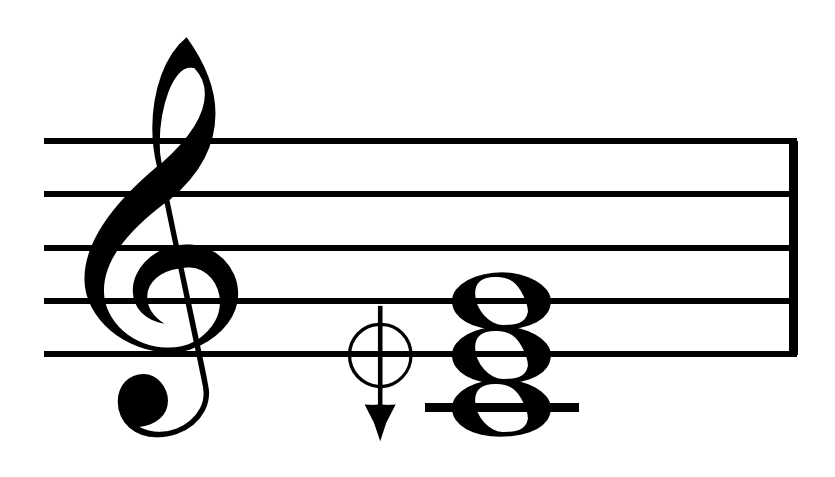
Major chord (parsimonious trichord) on C in 15 equal temperament: all notes within 18 cents of just intonation (rather than 14 for 12 equal temperament).,, or

In music, 15 equal temperament, called 15-TET, 15-EDO, or 15-ET, is a tempered scale derived by dividing the octave into 15 equal steps (equal frequency ratios). Each step represents a frequency ratio of ^{15}√2 (=2^{(1/15)}), or 80 cents. Because 15 factors into 3 times 5, it can be seen as being made up of three scales of 5 equal divisions of the octave, each of which resembles the Slendro scale in Indonesian gamelan. 15 equal temperament is not a meantone system, rather being a superpyth system (tempering out 64:63, the septimal comma).

== History and use ==
Guitars have been constructed for 15-ET tuning. The American musician Wendy Carlos used 15-ET as one of two scales in the track "Afterlife" from the album Tales of Heaven and Hell. Easley Blackwood, Jr. has written and recorded a suite for 15-ET guitar. Blackwood believes that 15 equal temperament, "is likely to bring about a considerable enrichment of both classical and popular repertoire in a variety of styles".

== Notation ==
Easley Blackwood, Jr.'s notation of 15-EDO creates this chromatic scale:

B♯/C, C♯/D♭, D, D♯, E♭, E, E♯/F, F♯/G♭, G, G♯, A♭, A, A♯, B♭, B, B♯/C

Ups and Downs Notation uses up and down arrows, written as a caret and a lower-case "v", usually in a sans-serif font. One arrow equals one edostep. In note names, the arrows come first, to facilitate chord naming. This yields this chromatic scale:

B/C, ^C/^D♭, vC♯/vD,

D, ^D/^E♭, vD♯/vE,

E/F, ^F/^G♭, vF♯/vG,

G, ^G/^A♭, vG♯/vA,

A, ^A/^B♭, vA♯/vB, B/C

Chords are spelled differently. C–E♭–G is technically a C minor chord, but in fact it sounds like a sus2 chord C–D–G. The usual minor chord with 6/5 is the upminor chord. It's spelled as C–^E♭–G and named as C^m. Compare with ^Cm (^C–^E♭–^G).

Likewise the usual major chord with 5/4 is actually a downmajor chord. It's spelled as C–vE–G and named as Cv.

Porcupine Notation significantly changes chord spellings (e.g. the major triad is now C–E♯–G♯). In addition, enharmonic equivalences from 12-EDO are no longer valid. It yields the following chromatic scale:

C, C♯/D♭, D, D♯/E♭, E, E♯/F♭, F, F♯/G♭, G, G♯, A♭, A, A♯/B♭, B, B♯, C

One possible decatonic notation uses the digits 0-9. Each of the 3 circles of 5 fifths is notated either by the odd numbers, the even numbers, or with accidentals.

1, 1♯/2♭, 2, 3, 3♯/4♭, 4, 5, 5♯/6♭, 6, 7, 7♯/8♭, 8, 9, 9♯/0♭, 0, 1

In this article, unless specified otherwise, Blackwood's notation will be used.

== Interval size ==
Here are the sizes of some common intervals in 15-ET:

Size of intervals in 15 equal temperament
interval name	size (steps)	size (cents)	midi	just ratio	just (cents)	midi	error
octave	15	1200		2:1	1200		0
major seventh	14	1120		19:10	1111.2		+8.8
neutral seventh	13	1040		20:11	1035		+5
harmonic seventh	12	960		7:4	968.83		-8.83
just major sixth	11	880		5:3	884.36		-4.36
minor sixth	10	800		8:5	813.69		-13.69
perfect fifth	9	720		3:2	701.96		+18.04
undecimal semidiminished fifth	8	640		16:11	648.68		-8.68
septimal tritone	7	560		7:5	582.51		−22.51
11:8 wide fourth	7	560		11:8	551.32		+8.68
perfect fourth	6	480		4:3	498.04		−18.04
septimal major third (a stack of 2 perfect fifths minus a harmonic seventh)	6	480		9:7	435.08		+44.92
septimal major third (by direct approximation)	5	400		9:7	435.08		−35.08
undecimal major third	5	400		14:11	417.51		−17.51
major third	5	400		5:4	386.31		+13.69
minor third	4	320		6:5	315.64		+4.36
septimal minor third	3	240		7:6	266.87		−26.87
septimal whole tone	3	240		8:7	231.17		+8.83
major tone	3	240		9:8	203.91		+36.09
minor tone	2	160		10:9	182.40		−22.40
lesser undecimal neutral second	2	160		12:11	150.63		+9.36
just diatonic semitone	1	80		16:15	111.73		−31.73
septimal chromatic semitone	1	80		21:20	84.46		−4.47
just chromatic semitone	1	80		25:24	70.67		+9.33

15-ET matches the 7th and 11th harmonics well, but only matches the 3rd and 5th harmonics roughly. The perfect fifth is more out of tune than in 12-ET, 19-ET, or 22-ET, and the major third in 15-ET is the same as the major third in 12-ET, but the other intervals matched are more in tune (except for the septimal tritones). 15-ET is the smallest tuning that matches the 11th harmonic at all and still has a usable perfect fifth, but its match to intervals utilizing the 11th harmonic is poorer than 22-ET, which also has more in-tune fifths and major thirds.

Although it contains a perfect fifth as well as major and minor thirds, the remainder of the harmonic and melodic language of 15-ET is quite different from 12-ET, and thus 15-ET could be described as xenharmonic. Unlike 12-ET and 19-ET, 15-ET matches the 11:8 and 16:11 ratios. 15-ET also has a neutral second and septimal whole tone. To construct a major third in 15-ET, one must stack two intervals of different sizes, whereas one can divide both the minor third and perfect fourth into two equal intervals.

== Further subdivisions ==
=== 45 equal temperament ===
45 equal temperament, which has a step size of 26.67 cents, is a threefold subdivision of 15 equal temperament. It has a perfect fifth of 693.33 cents, which is quite flat, but is still more accurate than the 720-cent fifth of 15-ET. Its best major third is 373.33 cents, which is slightly more accurate than the 400-cent one.

45-ET is an important example of a flattone temperament. Thus, it tempers out the syntonic comma like meantone temperaments do, but has a different mapping for intervals involving the seventh harmonic. Ordinarily, in meantone temperaments the 7:4 ratio is equated with the augmented sixth, whereas in 45-ET, this interval is instead equated with the diminished seventh, due to the smaller size of the chroma. This makes pieces involving chromatic alterations sound quite different.

45-ET is practically equivalent to an extended 2/5-comma meantone. Although it is harmonically less accurate than meantone temperaments like 31-ET or 19-ET, having a flatter fifth than both, it is still more accurate than 12-ET.

=== 105 equal temperament ===
105 equal temperament (a sevenfold division of 15-ET) gives a meantone temperament with a fifth of 697.14 cents. It has a chromatic semitone equal to 80 cents, one step of 15-ET.

=== 270 equal temperament ===
270 equal temperament does not see as much practical use as it is an extremely fine equal division with a step size of 4.44 cents, eighteen of which make up one step of 15-ET. Nonetheless, it is of academic interest due to being exceptionally accurate for an equal temperament of its size, particularly in the 15 odd limit.
