= 22 equal temperament =

Division of an octave

In music, 22 equal temperament, called 22-TET, 22-EDO, or 22-ET, is the tempered scale derived by dividing the octave into 22 equal steps (equal frequency ratios). Each step represents a frequency ratio of ^{22}√2, or 54.55 cents.

When composing with 22-ET, one needs to take into account a variety of considerations. Considering the 5-limit, there is a difference between 3 fifths and the sum of 1 fourth and 1 major third. It means that, starting from C, there are two A's—one 16 steps and one 17 steps away. There is also a difference between a major tone and a minor tone. In C major, the second note (D) will be 4 steps away. However, in A minor, where A is 6 steps below C, the fourth note (D) will be 9 steps above A, so 3 steps above C. So when switching from C major to A minor, one needs to slightly change the D note. These discrepancies arise because, unlike 12-ET, 22-ET does not temper out the syntonic comma of 81/80, but instead exaggerates its size by mapping it to one step.

In the 7-limit, the septimal minor seventh (7/4) can be distinguished from the sum of a fifth (3/2) and a minor third (6/5), and the septimal subminor third (7/6) is different from the minor third (6/5). This mapping tempers out the septimal comma of 64/63, which allows 22-ET to function as a "Superpythagorean" system where four stacked fifths are equated with the septimal major third (9/7) rather than the usual pental third of 5/4. This system is a "mirror image" of septimal meantone in many ways: meantone systems tune the fifth flat so that intervals of 5 are simple while intervals of 7 are complex, superpythagorean systems have the fifth tuned sharp so that intervals of 7 are simple while intervals of 5 are complex. The enharmonic structure is also reversed: sharps are sharper than flats, similar to Pythagorean tuning (and by extension 53 equal temperament), but to a greater degree.

Finally, 22-ET has a good approximation of the 11th harmonic, and is in fact the smallest equal temperament to be consistent in the 11-limit.

The net effect is that 22-ET allows (and to some extent even forces) the exploration of new musical territory, while still having excellent approximations of common practice consonances.

== History and use ==
The idea of dividing the octave into 22 steps of equal size seems to have originated with nineteenth-century music theorist RHM Bosanquet. Inspired by the use of a 22-tone unequal division of the octave in the music theory of India, Bosanquet noted that a 22-tone equal division was capable of representing 5-limit music with tolerable accuracy. In this he was followed in the twentieth century by theorist José Würschmidt, who noted it as a possible next step after 19 equal temperament, and J. Murray Barbour in his survey of tuning history, Tuning and Temperament. Contemporary advocates of 22 equal temperament include music theorist Paul Erlich and electronic music composer Sevish.

== Notation ==
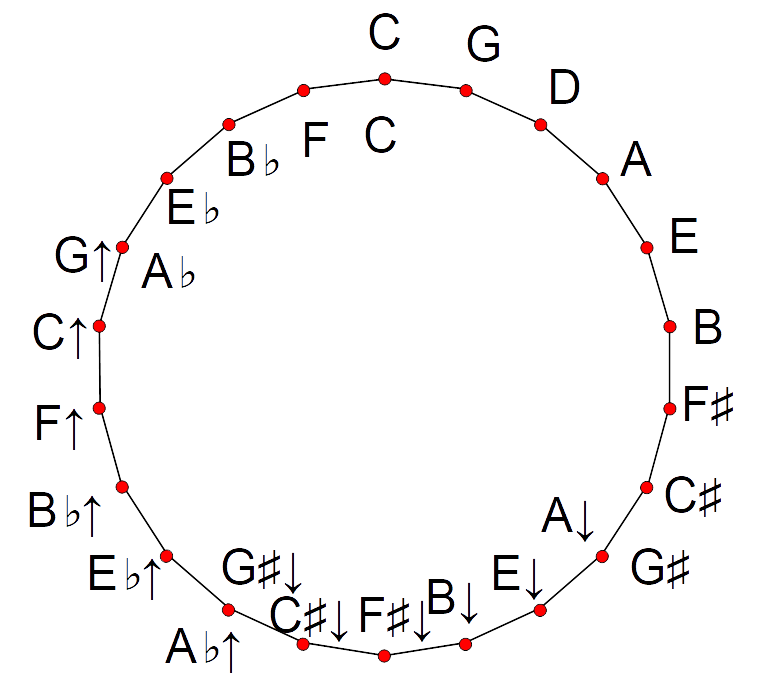
Circle of fifths in 22 tone equal temperament, "ups and downs" notation

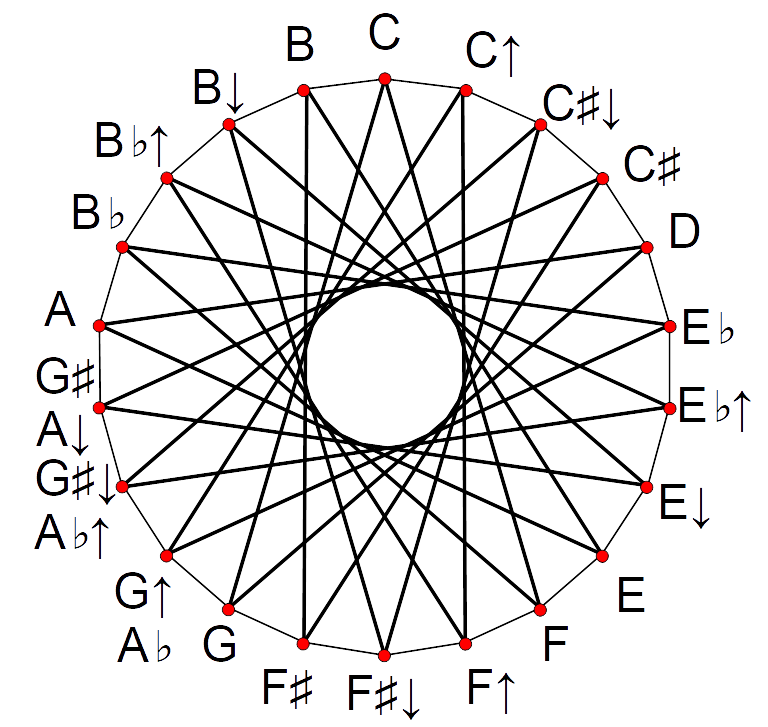
Circle of edosteps in 22 tone equal temperament, "ups and downs" notation

22-EDO can be notated several ways. The first, Ups And Downs Notation, uses up and down arrows, written as a caret and a lower-case "v", usually in a sans-serif font. One arrow equals one edostep. In note names, the arrows come first, to facilitate chord naming. This yields the following chromatic scale:

C, ^C/D♭, vC♯/^D♭, C♯/vD,

D, ^D/E♭, vD♯/^E♭, D♯/vE, E,

F, ^F/G♭, vF♯/^G♭, F♯/vG,

G, ^G/A♭, vG♯/^A♭, G♯/vA,

A, ^A/B♭, vA♯/^B♭, A♯/vB, B, C

The Pythagorean minor chord with 32/27 on C is still named Cm and still spelled C–E♭–G. But the 5-limit upminor chord uses the upminor 3rd 6/5 and is spelled C–^E♭–G. This chord is named C^m. Compare with ^Cm (^C–^E♭–^G).

The second, Quarter Tone Notation, uses half-sharps and half-flats instead of up and down arrows:

C, C, C♯/D♭, D,

D, D, D♯/E♭, E, E,

F, F, F♯/G♭, G,

G, G, G♯/A♭, A,

A, A, A♯/B♭, B, B, C

However, chords and some enharmonic equivalences are much different than they are in 12-EDO. For example, even though a 5-limit C minor triad is notated as C–E♭–G, C major triads are now C–E–G instead of C–E–G, and an A minor triad is now A–C–E even though an A major triad is still A–C♯–E. Additionally, while major seconds such as C–D are divided as expected into 4 quarter tones, minor seconds such as E–F and B–C are 1 quarter tone, not 2. Thus E♯ is now equivalent to F instead of F, F♭ is equivalent to E instead of E, F is equivalent to E, and E is equivalent to F. Furthermore, the note a fifth above B is not the expected F♯ but rather F or G, and the note that is a fifth below F is now B instead of B♭.

The third, Porcupine Notation, introduces no new accidentals, but significantly changes chord spellings (e.g. the 5-limit major triad is now C–E♯–G♯). In addition, enharmonic equivalences from 12-EDO are no longer valid. This yields the following chromatic scale:

C, C♯, D♭, D, D♯, E♭, E, E♯, F♭, F, F♯, G♭, G, G♯, G/A, A♭, A, A♯, B♭, B, B♯, C♭, C

== Interval size ==
Just intervals approximated in 22 equal temperament

The table below gives the sizes of some common intervals in 22 equal temperament. Intervals shown with a shaded background—such as the septimal tritones—are more than 1/4 of a step (approximately 13.6 cents) out of tune, when compared to the just ratios they approximate.

Interval name	Size (steps)	Size (cents)	MIDI	Just ratio	Just (cents)	MIDI	Error (cents)
octave (2nd harmonic)	22	1200		2:1	1200		0
ultramajor seventh	21	1145.45		27:14	1137.04		+8.41
major seventh (15th harmonic)	20	1090.91		15:8	1088.27		+2.64
neutral seventh	19	1036.4		11:6	1049.4		−13.0
greater just minor seventh	19	1036.4		9:5	1017.6		+18.8
lesser just minor seventh	18	981.8		16:9	996.1		−14.3
septimal minor seventh (7th harmonic)	18	981.8		7:4	968.8		+13.0
septimal major sixth	17	927.3		12:7	933.1		−5.9
major sixth	16	872.7		5:3	884.4		−11.6
neutral sixth (13th harmonic)	15	818.2		13:8	840.5		−22.3
minor sixth	15	818.2		8:5	813.7		+4.5
undecimal minor sixth	14	763.6		11:7	782.5		−18.9
septimal minor sixth	14	763.6		14:9	764.9		−1.3
perfect fifth (3rd harmonic)	13	709.1		3:2	702.0		+7.1
undecimal semidiminished fifth	12	654.55		16:11	648.68		+5.87
greater septimal tritone	11	600		10:7	617.5		−17.5
lesser septimal tritone	11	600		7:5	582.5		+17.5
lesser undecimal tritone (11th harmonic)	10	545.5		11:8	551.3		−5.9
perfect fourth	9	490.9		4:3	498.1		−7.1
septimal major third	8	436.4		9:7	435.1		+1.3
major third (5th harmonic)	7	381.8		5:4	386.3		−4.5
undecimal neutral third	6	327.3		11:9	347.4		−20.1
minor third	6	327.3		6:5	315.6		+11.6
septimal minor third	5	272.7		7:6	266.9		+5.9
septimal whole tone	4	218.2		8:7	231.2		−13.0
large just whole tone (9th harmonic)	4	218.2		9:8	203.9		+14.3
small just whole tone	3	163.6		10:9	182.4		−18.8
undecimal neutral second	3	163.6		11:10	165.0		−1.4
tridecimal diatonic semitone	2	163.6		13:12	138.6		+25.0
septimal diatonic semitone	2	109.1		15:14	119.4		−10.4
diatonic semitone	2	109.1		16:15	111.7		−2.6
minor diatonic semitone (17th harmonic)	2	109.1		17:16	105.0		+4.1
septimal chromatic semitone	2	109.1		21:20	84.5		+24.6
just chromatic semitone	1	54.6		25:24	70.7		−16.1
septimal quarter tone	1	54.6		36:35	48.8		+5.8

== See also ==
- Musical temperament
- Equal temperament
