= Sixth tone =

Musical interval

A sixth tone is a musical interval approximately one-third of a half-step (33.3̅ cents), thus producing 36 pitches per octave.

Just intonation intervals approximated in 36 equal temperament

== See also ==
- Septimal sixth tone
- Varieties of equal temperament
- 72 equal temperament
- Septimal diesis
