= Septimal comma =

3-limit 9:8 major tone

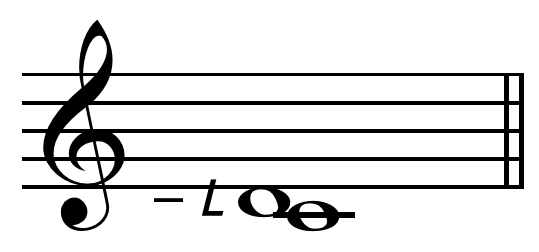
7-limit 8:7 septimal whole tone

A septimal comma is a small musical interval in just intonation that contains the number seven in its prime factorization. There is more than one such interval, so the term septimal comma is ambiguous, but it most commonly refers to the interval 64/63 (27.26 cents).

Use of septimal commas introduces new intervals that extend tuning beyond common-practice, extending music to the 7-limit, including the 7/6 septimal minor third, the 7/5 septimal tritone and the 8/7 septimal major second. Composers who made extensive use of these intervals include Harry Partch and Ben Johnston. Johnston uses a "7" as an accidental to indicate a note is lowered 49 cents, or an upside down seven ("ㄥ" or "") to indicate a note is raised 49 cents (36/35).

== Specific commas ==
Septimal comma, 64/63

The 64/63 septimal comma, also known as Archytas' Comma, is the interval equal to the difference between a major and septimal whole tone (with 9/8 and 8/7 ratios, respectively). Alternatively, it can be viewed as the difference between the 16/9 Pythagorean minor seventh (the composition of two 4/3 perfect fourths) and the 7/4 harmonic seventh. Its size is 27.264 cents, slightly larger than the Pythagorean comma.

The composition of the septimal comma and the syntonic comma is 36/35, known as the septimal diesis. Its size is 48.8 cents, making it practically a quarter tone. The septimal diesis appears as the difference between many septimal intervals and their 5-limit counterparts: the minor seventh (9/5) and the seventh harmonic (7/4), the 8/7 septimal whole tone and the 10/9 minor whole tone, the 7/6 septimal minor third and the 6/5 minor third, the 9/7 septimal major third and the 5/4 major third, and many more.

Septimal diesis

Other septimal commas include 49/48 (occasionally called the slendro diesis), which commonly appears as the difference between a ratio with 7 in the denominator and another with 7 in the numerator, like 8/7 and 7/6; and 50/49, called the tritonic diesis, because it is the difference between the two septimal tritones, 7/5 and 10/7, or Erlich's decatonic comma, because it plays an important role in the ten-tone scales of Paul Erlich (the intervals are tempered so that 50/49 vanishes).

The septimal kleisma and the septimal semicomma are smaller septimal commas.

== Summary ==
Ratio	Size in cents	Ben Johnston's notation	Names
64/63	27.26	C-	Septimal comma, Archytas' comma
50/49	34.98	B♯-	Septimal sixth-tone, tritonic diesis, Erlich's decatonic comma
49/48	35.7	D♭	Slendro diesis
36/35	48.77	C	Septimal quarter tone
