= 7/6 =

7/6 may refer to:

- July 6 (month-day date notation)
- June 7 (day-month date notation)
- Septimal minor third, a musical interval in 7-limit just intonation
