= Tredecimal =

Tredecimal, Tridecimal, and Triskadecimal (i.e., pertaining to the number 13) may refer to:

- Base 13 number system
- Limit (music), 13-limit tuning and intervals
  - A type of neutral third music interval
