= 9/7 =

9/7 may refer to:

- September 7 (month-day date notation)
- July 9 (day-month date notation)
- Septimal major third, a musical interval in 7-limit just intonation with ratio 9/7
