= Septimal third tone =

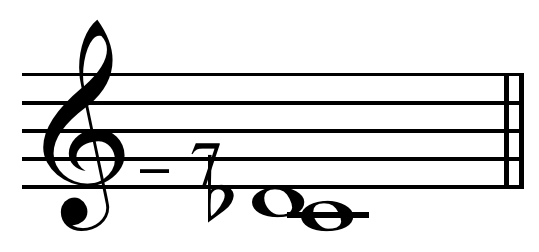
Septimal third tone on C.

A septimal 1/3-tone (in music) is an interval with the ratio of 28:27, which is the difference between the perfect fourth and the supermajor third. It is about 62.96 cents wide. The septimal 1/3-tone can be viewed either as a musical interval in its own right, or as a comma; if it is tempered out in a given tuning system, the distinction between these two intervals is lost. The septimal 1/3-tone may be derived from the harmonic series as the interval between the twenty-seventh and twenty-eighth harmonics. It may be considered a diesis.

The septimal 1/3-tone, along with the septimal diesis is tempered out by five-tone equal temperament, and equal temperaments which divide the octave into a small multiple of 5 steps, such as 15-TET and 25-TET. This family of scales is known as Blackwood temperament in honor of Easley Blackwood, Jr., who first analyzed 10-note subsets of 15-TET that take advantage of the temperament.

When added to the 15:14 semitone, the 21:20 semitone and 28:27 semitone produce the 9:8 tone (major tone) and 10:9 tone (minor tone), respectively.

It is the difference between 7/6 and 9/8 (tritē and paramesē).

== Septimal sixth tone ==
The septimal sixth tone, also called the jubilisma, is a 7-limit musical interval approximately the size of 1/6 of a whole tone (203.91/6=33.99 cents). An interval with the ratio of 50:49, about 34.98 cents, which in just intonation is the difference between the lesser septimal (7:5) tritone, and its inversion, the greater septimal tritone (10:7). This interval is tempered out by 12-TET and 22-TET, but not by 19-TET, 31-TET or any other odd division of the octave.
