= Neutral interval =

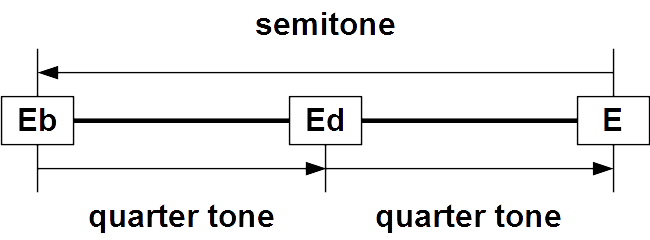
Neutral third

In music theory, a neutral interval in 24 TET (including extensions), (but also known as a submajor interval, or as a superminor interval, in Just Intonation), is an interval that is neither major nor minor, but is, instead, in-between them.

In 12 TET, these intervals are a quarter tone sharper than minor intervals and a quarter tone flatter than major intervals. For example, the minor third is tuned at 300 ¢, while the major third is a semitone (100 ¢) sharper (400 ¢), and so the neutral third lies between them at 350 ¢.

A neutral interval inverts to another neutral interval.

In just intonation, as well as in tunings such as 31-ET, 41-ET, or 72-ET, which more closely approximate it with more of them, such intervals can be closer together.

intervals	minor	neutral	major
seconds	D♭	D	D♮
thirds	E♭	E	E♮
sixths	A♭	A	A♮
sevenths	B♭	B	B♮

== Second ==
Neutral second
- Inverse: neutral seventh

Name
- Abbreviation: n2

Size
- Semitones: ~1 1/2
- Interval class: ~1 1/2
- Just interval: 11:10 or 12:11

Cents
- Equal temperament: 100 or 200
- 24-Tone equal temperament: 150
- Just intonation: 165 or 151

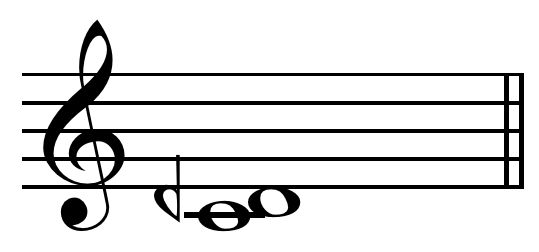
Neutral second on C.

A neutral second or medium second is an interval wider than a minor second and narrower than a major second. Three distinct intervals may be termed neutral seconds:

- The intermediate neutral second, called the lesser undecimal neutral second, has a ratio between the higher-frequency tone to the lower-frequency tone of 12:11 and is about 150.64 cents wide, while the larger one,
- the greater undecimal neutral second, has a ratio of 11:10 between the two tones and is about 165.00 cents wide. The lesser undecimal neutral second may be derived from the harmonic series as the interval between the eleventh and twelfth harmonics. The greater undecimal neutral second may be derived from the harmonic series as the interval between the tenth and eleventh harmonics.
- An equal-tempered neutral second is characterized by a difference in 150 cents between the two tones, a hair smaller than a ratio of frequencies between the two tones of 12:11, and exactly half of an equal-tempered minor third.

The equal-tempered neutral is found in some traditional Arabic music (see also Arab tone system). Because the equal tempered neutral second is essentially a semitone (minor second) plus a quarter-tone, they may be considered three-quarter tones in the quarter tone scale.

=== In equal temperament ===
Approximations to the 12:11 and 11:10 neutral seconds can be found in a number of equally tempered tuning systems. 11:10 is very closely matched by 22-ET, whereas 12:11 is matched by 24-ET, 31-ET and 41-ET. 72-ET matches both intervals closely and is also the smallest widely used equal temperament that uniquely matches both intervals. Tuning systems that temper out the comma of 121:120 do not distinguish between the two intervals. 17-ET has a neutral second between 12:11 and 13:12, and a neutral third between 16:13 and 11:9.

== Seventh ==
Neutral seventh
- Inverse: neutral second

Name
- Other names: -
- Abbreviation: n7

Size
- Semitones: ~10 1/2
- Interval class: ~1 1/2
- Just interval: 11:6, 64:35, or 24:13

Cents
- Equal temperament: 1000 or 1100
- 24-Tone equal temperament: 1050
- Just intonation: 1049, 1045, or 1061

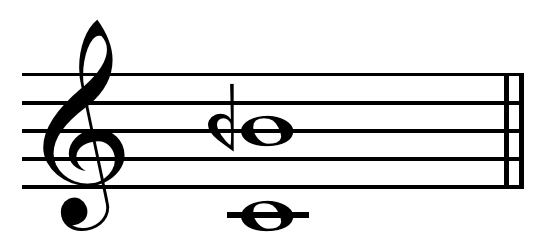
Neutral seventh on C.

A neutral seventh is a musical interval wider than a minor seventh but narrower than a major seventh. Four distinct intervals may be termed neutral sevenths:

- A septimal neutral seventh has a ratio of 64:35 or about 1045 cents.
- The just undecimal neutral seventh has a ratio of 11:6 between the frequencies of the two tones, or about 1049 cents. Alternately, 13:7 or about 1071.7 cents.
- A tridecimal neutral seventh has a ratio of 24:13 between the frequencies of the two tones, or about 1061 cents. This is the largest neutral seventh, and occurs infrequently in music, as little music utilizes the 13th harmonic.
- An equal-tempered neutral seventh is characterized by a difference in 1050 cents between the two tones, a hair larger than the 11:6 ratio, and exactly half of an equal-tempered major thirteenth (octave plus major sixth).

These intervals are all within about 12 cents of each other and are difficult for most people to distinguish.

A neutral seventh can be formed by stacking a neutral third together with a perfect fifth. Based on its positioning in the harmonic series, the undecimal neutral seventh implies a root one perfect fifth below the lower of the two notes.

== See also ==
- Major fourth and minor fifth
- Subminor and supermajor
- List of pitch intervals
- Microtonal music
