= Lemme Rossi =

Italian music theorist

Lemme Rossi (died 1673) was an Italian music theorist. He was the first to publish a discussion of 31 equal temperament, the division of the octave into 31 equal parts, in his Sistema musico, ouero Musica speculativa doue SI spiegano i più celebri sistemi di tutti i tre generi of 1666. This slightly predates the publication of the same idea by the scientist Christiaan Huygens.
