= Septimal kleisma =

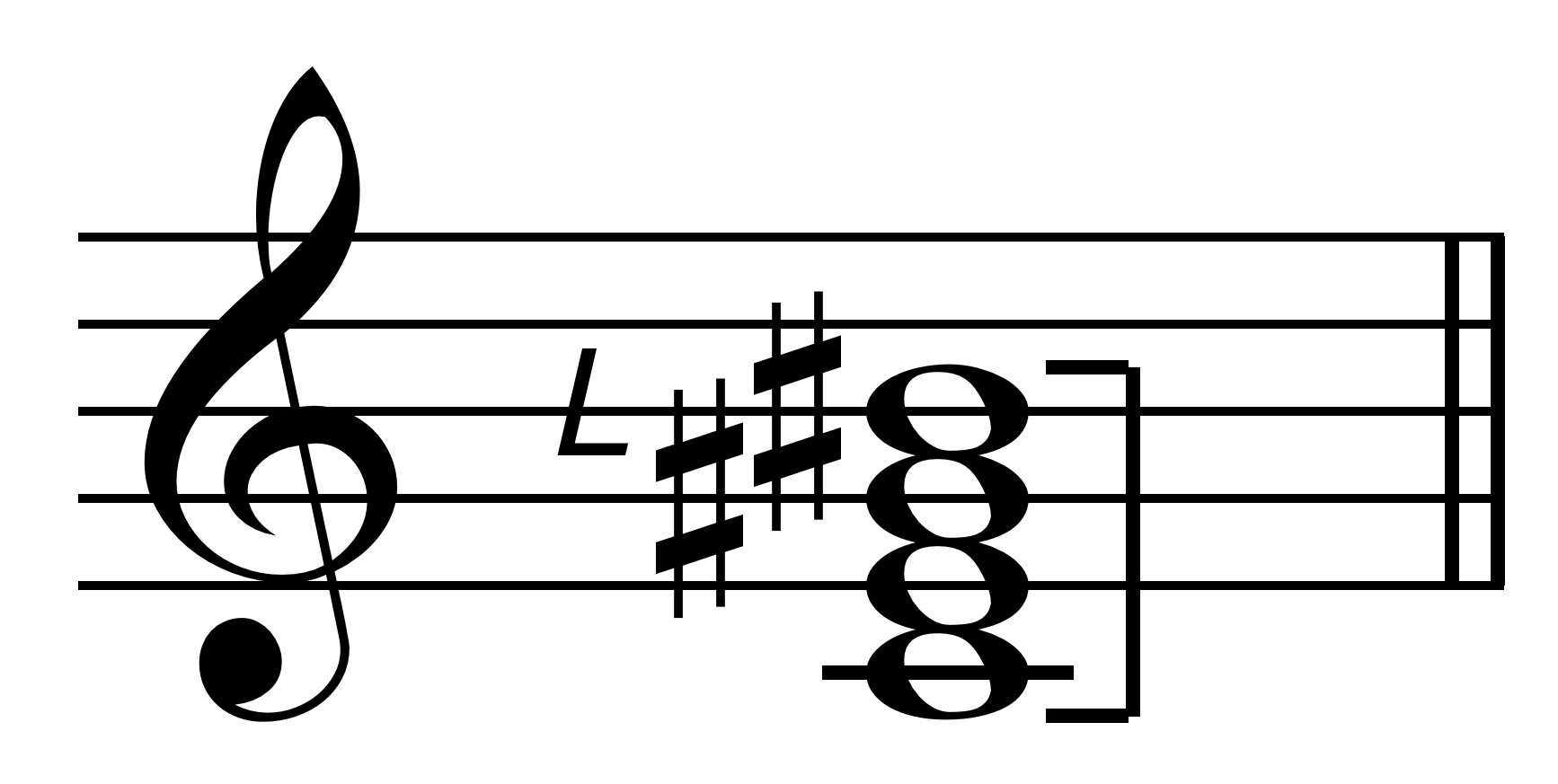
Septimal kleisma: B♯

In music, the ratio 225/224 is called the septimal kleisma or marvel comma. It is a minute comma type interval of approximately 7.7 cents. Factoring it into primes gives 2^{−5} 3^{2} 5^{2} 7^{−1}, which can be rewritten 2^{−1} (5/4)^{2} (9/7). That says that it is the amount that two major thirds of 5/4 and a septimal major third, or supermajor third, of 9/7 exceeds the octave. In marvel temperaments, stacking two 5/4 major thirds and a 9/7 septimal major third gets you exactly an octave; this lends the name marvel comma to this interval, as it is tempered out in marvel tunings.

The septimal kleisma can also be viewed as the difference between the diatonic semitone (16:15) and the septimal diatonic semitone (15:14).
