= Septimal diesis =

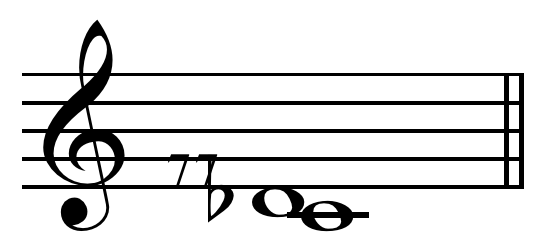
Septimal diesis on C.

In music, septimal diesis (or slendro diesis) is an interval with the ratio of 49:48, which is the difference between the septimal whole tone and the septimal minor third. It is about 35.7 cents wide, which is narrower than a quarter-tone but wider than the septimal comma. It may also be the ratio 36:35, or 48.77 cents.

== In equal temperament ==
In 12 equal temperament this interval is not tempered out; the septimal whole tone and septimal minor third are replaced by the normal whole tone and minor third. This makes the diesis a semitone, about twice its "correct" size. The septimal diesis is tempered out by a number of equally tempered tuning systems, including 19-ET, 24-ET and 29-ET; these tunings do not distinguish between the septimal whole tone and septimal minor third. It is not tempered out however by 22-ET or 31-ET (or indeed any equal temperament with at least 30 steps).

== See also ==
- Diesis
