= Major sixth =

Musical interval of 9 semitones

- Inverse: Minor third

Name
- Abbreviation: M6

Tuning
- 12 equal temperament: 9 semitones (900 cents)
- Pythagorean tuning: 27:16 (~905.87 cents)
- 5-limit tuning: 5:3 (~884.36 cents)
- 7-limit tuning: 12:7 (~933.13 cents)

In music theory, a sixth is a musical interval encompassing six note letter names or staff positions (see Interval number for more details), and the major sixth is one of two commonly occurring sixths. It is qualified as major because it is the larger of the two. The major sixth spans nine semitones. Its smaller counterpart, the minor sixth, spans eight semitones. For example, the interval from C up to the nearest A is a major sixth.

It is a sixth because it encompasses six note letter names (C, D, E, F, G, A) and six staff positions. It is a major sixth, not a minor sixth, because the note A lies nine semitones above C. Diminished and augmented sixths (such as C♯ to A♭ and C to A♯) span the same number of note letter names and staff positions, but consist of a different number of semitones (seven and ten, respectively).

The intervals from the tonic (keynote) in an upward direction to the second, to the third, to the sixth, and to the seventh scale degrees (of a major scale are called major.

A commonly cited example of a melody featuring the major sixth as its opening is "My Bonnie Lies Over the Ocean".

The major sixth is one of the consonances of common practice music, along with the unison, octave, perfect fifth, major and minor thirds, minor sixth, and (sometimes) the perfect fourth. In the common practice period, sixths were considered interesting and dynamic consonances along with their inverses the thirds. In medieval times, theorists always described them as Pythagorean major sixths of 27/16 and therefore considered them dissonances unusable in a stable final sonority. How major sixths actually were sung in the Middle Ages is unknown. In just intonation, the (5/3) major sixth is classed as a consonance of the 5-limit.

A major sixth is also used in transposing music to E♭ instruments, like the alto clarinet, alto saxophone, E♭ tuba, trumpet, natural horn, and alto horn when in E♭, as a written C sounds like E♭ on those instruments.

Assuming close-position voicings for the following examples, the major sixth occurs in a first inversion minor triad, a second inversion major triad, and either inversion of a diminished triad. It also occurs in the second and third inversions of a dominant seventh chord.

== Frequency proportions ==
Major sixth (equal temperament)
The file plays middle C, followed by A (a tone 900 cents sharper than C), followed by both tones together.

Many intervals in a various tuning systems qualify to be called "major sixth", sometimes with additional qualifying words in the names. The following examples are sorted by increasing width.

In just intonation, the most common major sixth is the pitch ratio of 5:3, approximately 884 cents.

In 12-tone equal temperament, a major sixth is equal to nine semitones, exactly 900 cents, with a frequency ratio of the (9/12) root of 2 over 1.

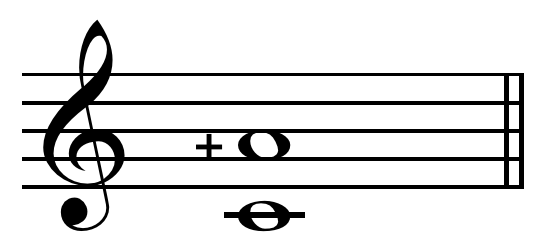
Pythagorean major sixth, 3 Pythagorean perfect fifths on C

Another major sixth is the Pythagorean major sixth with a ratio of 27:16, approximately 906 cents, called "Pythagorean" because it can be constructed from three just perfect fifths (C–A = C–G–D–A = $702+702+702-1200=906$). It is the inversion of the Pythagorean minor third, and corresponds to the interval between the 27th and the 16th harmonics. The 27:16 Pythagorean major sixth arises in the C Pythagorean major scale between F and D, as well as between C and A, G and E, and D and B. In the 5-limit justly tuned major scale, it occurs between the 4th and 2nd degrees (in C major, between F and D).

Another major sixth is the 12:7 septimal major sixth or supermajor sixth, the inversion of the septimal minor third, of approximately 933 cents. The septimal major sixth (12/7) is approximated in 53-tone equal temperament by an interval of 41 steps, giving an actual frequency ratio of the (41/53) root of 2 over 1, approximately 928 cents.

The nineteenth subharmonic is a major sixth, A = 32/19 = 902.49 cents.

The septimal major sixth (12/7) is approximated in 53 tone equal temperament by an interval of 41 steps or 928 cents.

== See also ==
- Musical tuning
- List of meantone intervals
- Sixth chord
