= 31 equal temperament =

Microtonal tuning system in music

31 EDO on the regular diatonic tuning continuum at p5 = 696.77 cents

In music, 31 equal temperament, 31 ET, which can also be abbreviated 31 TET (31 tone ET) or 31 EDO (equal division of the octave), also known as tricesimoprimal, is the tempered scale derived by dividing the octave into 31 equally-proportioned steps (equal frequency ratios). Each step represents a frequency ratio of ^{31}√2 , or 38.71 cents.

31 EDO is often thought to be a very accurate approximation of quarter-comma meantone temperament. More generally, it is a regular diatonic tuning in which the tempered perfect fifth is equal to 696.77 cents, as shown in Figure 1. On an isomorphic keyboard, the fingering of music composed in 31 EDO is precisely the same as it is in any other syntonic tuning (such as 12 EDO), so long as the notes are spelled properly—that is, with no assumption of enharmonicity.

== History and use ==
Division of the octave into 31 steps arose naturally out of Renaissance music theory; the lesser diesis – the ratio of an octave to three major thirds, 128:125 or 41.06 cents – was approximately one-fifth of a tone or two-fifths of a semitone. In 1555, Nicola Vicentino proposed an extended-meantone tuning of 31 tones. In 1666, Lemme Rossi first proposed an equal temperament of this order. In 1691, having discovered it independently, scientist Christiaan Huygens wrote about it also. Since the standard system of tuning at that time was quarter-comma meantone, in which the fifth is tuned to ^{4}√5 , the appeal of this method was immediate, as the fifth of 31 EDO, at 696.77 cents, is very slightly closer to a true 2:3 interval than the fifth of quarter-comma meantone. Huygens not only realized this, he went farther and noted that 31 EDO provides an excellent approximation of septimal, or 7 limit harmony.

In the twentieth century, physicist, music theorist, and composer Adriaan Fokker, after reading Huygens's work, led a revival of interest in this system of tuning which led to a number of compositions, particularly by Dutch composers. Fokker designed the Fokker organ, a 31 tone equal-tempered organ, which was installed in Teyler's Museum in Haarlem in 1951 and moved to Muziekgebouw aan 't IJ in 2010 where it has been frequently used in concerts since it moved.

== Interval size ==
19 limit just intonation intervals approximated in 31 EDO

Here are the sizes of some common intervals:

interval name	size (steps)	size (cents)	midi audio	just ratio	just (cents)	midi audio	error (cents)
octave	31	1200		2:1	1200		0
minor seventh	26	1006.45		9:5	1017.60		−11.15
grave just minor seventh	26	1006.45		16:9	996.09		+10.36
harmonic seventh, subminor seventh, augmented sixth	25	967.74		7:4	968.83		−1.09
major sixth	23	890.32		5:3	884.39		+5.93
minor sixth	21	812.90		8:5	813.69		−0.78
augmented fifth	20	774.19		25:16	772.63		
perfect fifth	18	696.77		3:2	701.96		−5.19
greater septimal tritone, diminished fifth	16	619.35		10:7	617.49		+1.87
lesser septimal tritone, augmented fourth	15	580.65		7:5	582.51		−1.86
undecimal tritone, half augmented fourth, 11th harmonic	14	541.94		11:8	551.32		−9.38
perfect fourth	13	503.23		4:3	498.04		+5.19
septimal narrow fourth, half diminished fourth	12	464.52		21:16	470.78		−6.26
tridecimal augmented third, and greater major third	12	464.52		13:10	454.21		+10.31
septimal major third	11	425.81		9:7	435.08		−9.27
diminished fourth	11	425.81		32:25	427.37		−1.56
undecimal major third	11	425.81		14:11	417.51		+8.30
major third	10	387.10		5:4	386.31		+0.79
tridecimal neutral third	9	348.39		16:13	359.47		−11.09
undecimal neutral third	9	348.39		11:9	347.41		+0.98
minor third	8	309.68		6:5	315.64		−5.96
septimal minor third	7	270.97		7:6	266.87		+4.10
septimal whole tone	6	232.26		8:7	231.17		+1.09
whole tone, major tone	5	193.55		9:8	203.91		−10.36
whole tone, major second	5	193.55		28:25	196.20		−2.65
mean tone, major second	5	193.55		√5 :2	193.16		+0.39
whole tone, minor tone	5	193.55		10:9	182.40		+11.15
greater undecimal neutral second	4	154.84		11:10	165.00		−10.16
lesser undecimal neutral second	4	154.84		12:11	150.64		+4.20
septimal diatonic semitone	3	116.13		15:14	119.44		−3.31
diatonic semitone, minor second	3	116.13		16:15	111.73		+4.40
septimal chromatic semitone	2	77.42		21:20	84.47		−7.05
chromatic semitone, augmented unison	2	77.42		25:24	70.67		+6.75
lesser diesis	1	38.71		128:125	41.06		−2.35
undecimal diesis	1	38.71		45:44	38.91		−0.20
septimal diesis	1	38.71		49:48	35.70		+3.01

The 31 equal temperament has a very close fit to the 7:6, 8:7, and 7:5 ratios, which have no approximate fits in 12 equal temperament and only poor fits in 19 equal temperament. The composer Joel Mandelbaum (born 1932) used this tuning system specifically because of its good matches to the 7th and 11th partials in the harmonic series. The tuning has poor matches to both the 9:8 and 10:9 intervals (major and minor tone in just intonation); however, it has a good match for the average of the two. Practically it is very close to quarter-comma meantone.

This tuning can be considered a meantone temperament. It has the necessary property that a chain of its four fifths is equivalent to its major third (the syntonic comma 81:80 is tempered out), which also means that it contains a "meantone" that falls between the sizes of 10:9 and 9:8 as the combination of one of each of its chromatic and diatonic semitones.

== Scale diagram ==
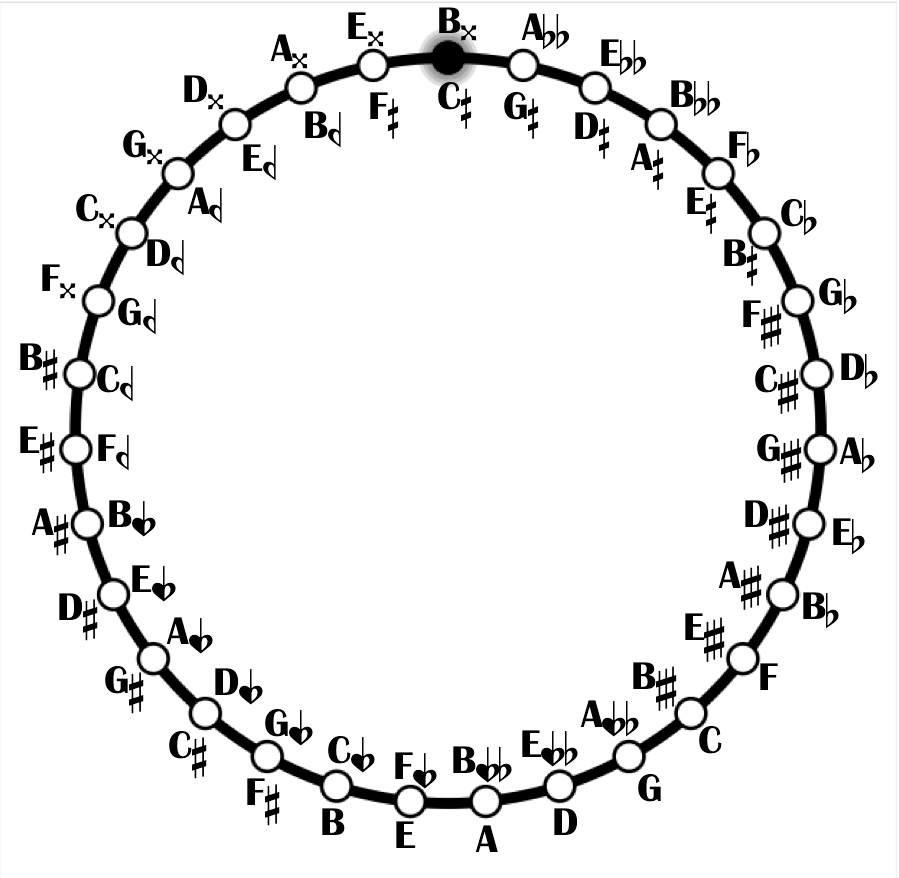
Circle of fifths in 31 equal temperament

The following are the 31 notes in the scale:

Interval (cents)	39	39	39	39	39	39	39	39	39	39	39	39	39	39	39	39	39	39	39	39	39	39	39	39	39	39	39	39	39	39	39	
Note name	A	G^{𝄪♯} B^{𝄫}	A^{♯}	B^{♭}	A^{𝄪} C^{𝄫}	B	C^{♭}	B^{♯}	C	B^{𝄪} D^{𝄫}	C^{♯}	D^{♭}	C^{𝄪} E^{♭𝄫}	D	C^{𝄪♯} E^{𝄫}	D^{♯}	E^{♭}	D^{𝄪} F^{𝄫}	E	F^{♭}	E^{♯}	F	E^{𝄪} G^{𝄫}	F^{♯}	G^{♭}	F^{𝄪} A^{♭𝄫}	G	F^{𝄪♯} A^{𝄫}	G^{♯}	A^{♭}	G^{𝄪} B^{♭𝄫}	A
Note (cents)	0	39	77	116	155	194	232	271	310	348	387	426	465	503	542	581	619	658	697	735	774	813	852	890	929	968	1006	1045	1084	1123	1161	1200

The five "double flat" notes and five "double sharp" notes may be replaced by half sharps and half flats, similar to the quarter tone system:

Interval (cents)	39	39	39	39	39	39	39	39	39	39	39	39	39	39	39	39	39	39	39	39	39	39	39	39	39	39	39	39	39	39	39	
Note name	A	A	A♯	B♭	B	B	B	C	C	C	C♯	D♭	D	D	D	D♯	E♭	E	E	E	F	F	F	F♯	G♭	G	G	G	G♯	A♭	A	A
Note (cents)	0	39	77	116	155	194	232	271	310	348	387	426	465	503	542	581	619	658	697	735	774	813	852	890	929	968	1006	1045	1084	1123	1161	1200

=== Scales ===
Signature	Scale							Key
15 sharps	G𝄪	A𝄪	B𝄪 (=D𝄫)	C𝄪	D𝄪	E𝄪 (=G𝄫)	F♯♯♯ (=A𝄫)	G𝄪 major, E𝄪 minor
14 sharps	C𝄪	D𝄪	E𝄪 (=G𝄫)	F𝄪	G𝄪	A𝄪	B𝄪 (=D𝄫)	C𝄪 major, A𝄪 minor
13 sharps	F𝄪	G𝄪	A𝄪	B♯	C𝄪	D𝄪	E𝄪 (=G𝄫)	F𝄪 major, D𝄪 minor
12 sharps	B♯	C𝄪	D𝄪	E♯	F𝄪	G𝄪	A𝄪	B♯ major, G𝄪 minor
11 sharps	E♯	F𝄪	G𝄪	A♯	B♯	C𝄪	D𝄪	E♯ major, C𝄪 minor
10 sharps	A♯	B♯	C𝄪	D♯	E♯	F𝄪	G𝄪	A♯ major, F𝄪 minor
9 sharps	D♯	E♯	F𝄪	G♯	A♯	B♯	C𝄪	D♯ major, B♯ minor
8 sharps	G♯	A♯	B♯	C♯	D♯	E♯	F𝄪	G♯ major, E♯ minor
7 sharps	C♯	D♯	E♯	F♯	G♯	A♯	B♯	C♯ major, A♯ minor
6 sharps	F♯	G♯	A♯	B	C♯	D♯	E♯	F♯ major, D♯ minor
5 sharps	B	C♯	D♯	E	F♯	G♯	A♯	B major, G♯ minor
4 sharps	E	F♯	G♯	A	B	C♯	D♯	E major, C♯ minor
3 sharps	A	B	C♯	D	E	F♯	G♯	A major, F♯ minor
2 sharps	D	E	F♯	G	A	B	C♯	D major, B minor
1 sharp	G	A	B	C	D	E	F♯	G major, E minor
—	C	D	E	F	G	A	B	C major, A minor
1 flat	F	G	A	B♭	C	D	E	F major, D minor
2 flats	B♭	C	D	E♭	F	G	A	B♭ major, G minor
3 flats	E♭	F	G	A♭	B♭	C	D	E♭ major, C minor
4 flats	A♭	B♭	C	D♭	E♭	F	G	A♭ major, F minor
5 flats	D♭	E♭	F	G♭	A♭	B♭	C	D♭ major, B♭ minor
6 flats	G♭	A♭	B♭	C♭	D♭	E♭	F	G♭ major, E♭ minor
7 flats	C♭	D♭	E♭	F♭	G♭	A♭	B♭	C♭ major, A♭ minor
8 flats	F♭	G♭	A♭	B𝄫	C♭	D♭	E♭	F♭ major, D♭ minor
9 flats	B𝄫	C♭	D♭	E𝄫	F♭	G♭	A♭	B𝄫 major, G♭ minor
10 flats	E𝄫	F♭	G♭	A𝄫	B𝄫	C♭	D♭	E𝄫 major, C♭ minor
11 flats	A𝄫	B𝄫	C♭	D𝄫	E𝄫	F♭	G♭	A𝄫 major, F♭ minor
12 flats	D𝄫	E𝄫	F♭	G𝄫	A𝄫	B𝄫	C♭	D𝄫 major, B𝄫 minor
13 flats	G𝄫	A𝄫	B𝄫	C𝄫 (=A𝄪)	D𝄫	E𝄫	F♭	G𝄫 major, E𝄫 minor
14 flats	C𝄫 (=A𝄪)	D𝄫	E𝄫	F𝄫 (=D𝄪)	G𝄫	A𝄫	B𝄫	C𝄫 major, A𝄫 minor
15 flats	F𝄫 (=D𝄪)	G𝄫	A𝄫	B♭♭♭ (=G𝄪)	C𝄫 (=A𝄪)	D𝄫	E𝄫	F𝄫 major, D𝄫 minor

Comparison between 1/ 4 comma meantone and 31 EDO (values in cents, rounded to 2 decimal places)
	C	C♯	D♭	D	D♯	E♭	E	E♯	F	F♯	G♭	G	G♯	A♭	A	A♯	B♭	B	C♭	C
1/ 4 comma:	0.00	76.05	117.11	193.16	269.21	310.26	386.31	462.36	503.42	579.47	620.53	696.58	772.63	813.69	889.74	965.78	1006.84	1082.89	1123.95	1200.00
31 EDO:	0.00	77.42	116.13	193.55	270.97	309.68	387.10	464.52	503.23	580.65	619.35	696.77	774.19	812.90	890.32	967.74	1006.45	1083.87	1122.58	1200.00

== Chords of 31 equal temperament ==
Many chords of 31 EDO are discussed in the article on septimal meantone temperament. Chords not discussed there include the neutral thirds triad, which might be written C–E–G, C–D𝄪–G or C–F𝄫–G, and the Orwell tetrad, which is C–E–F𝄪–B𝄫.

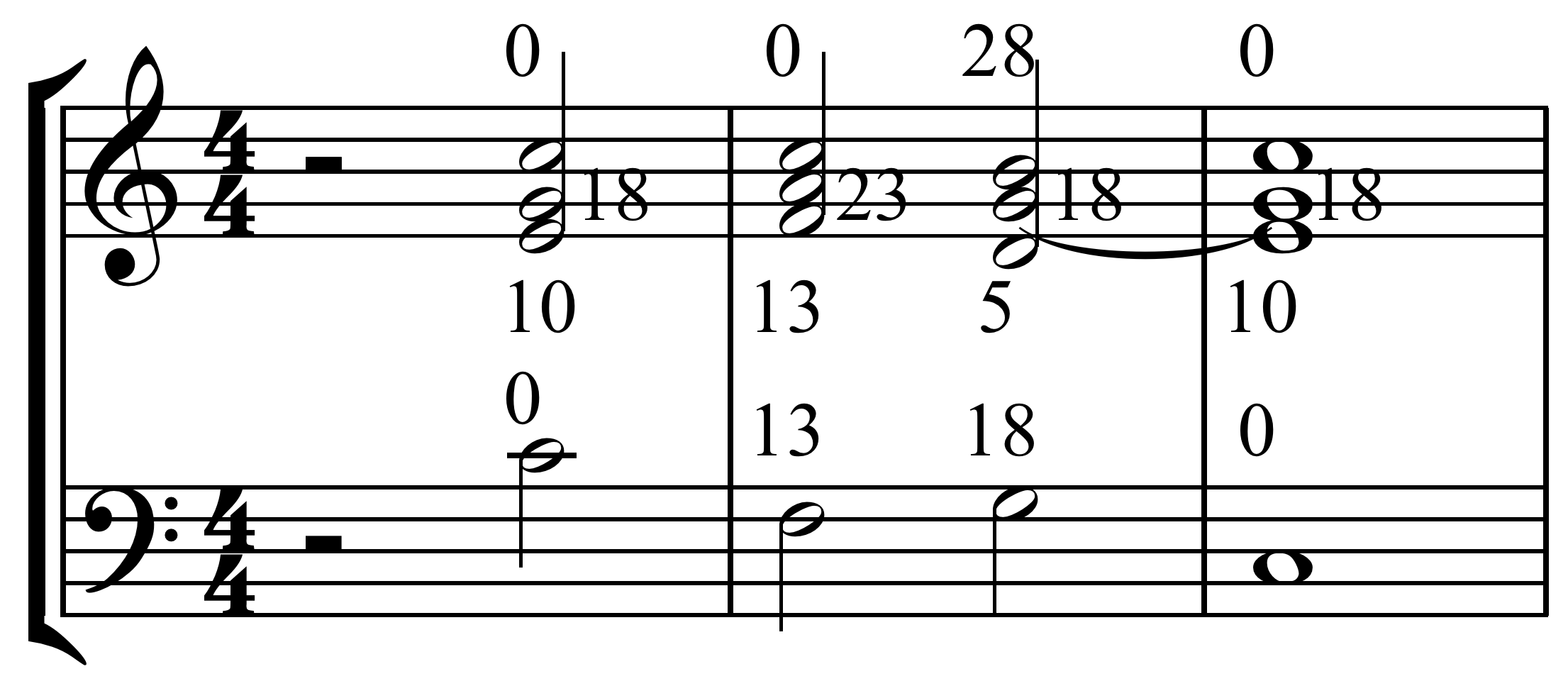
I–IV–V–I chord progression in 31 tone equal temperament. Whereas in 12 EDO B♮ is 11 steps, in 31 EDO B♮ is 28 steps.

C subminor, C minor, C major, C supermajor (topped by A♭) in 31 EDO

Usual chords like the major chord are rendered nicely in 31 EDO because the third and the fifth are very well approximated. Also, it is possible to play subminor chords (where the first third is subminor) and supermajor chords (where the first third is supermajor).

C seventh and G minor, twice in 31 EDO, then twice in 12 EDO

It is also possible to render nicely the harmonic seventh chord. For example on tonic C, with C–E–G–A♯. The seventh here is different from stacking a fifth and a minor third, which instead yields B♭ to make a dominant seventh. This difference cannot be made in 12 EDO.

== See also ==
- Archicembalo, alternate keyboard instrument with 36 keys per octave that was sometimes tuned as 31 EDO.
