= 7-limit tuning =

Musical instrument tuning with a limit of seven

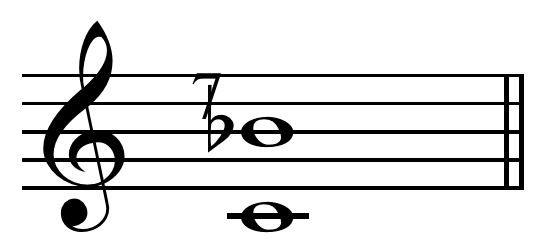
Harmonic seventh, septimal seventh

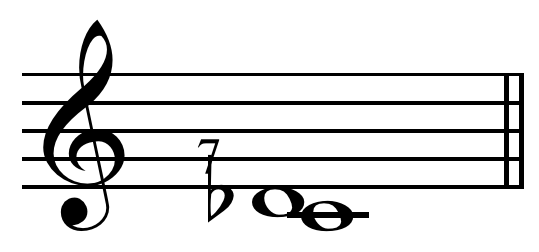
Septimal chromatic semitone on C

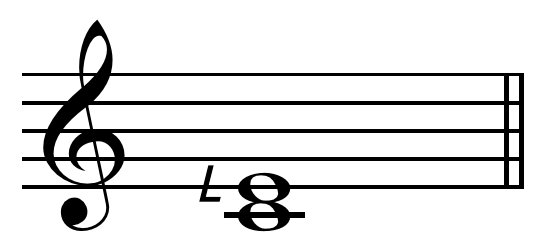
A 9/7 major third from C to E resembles a supermajor third or blue note.

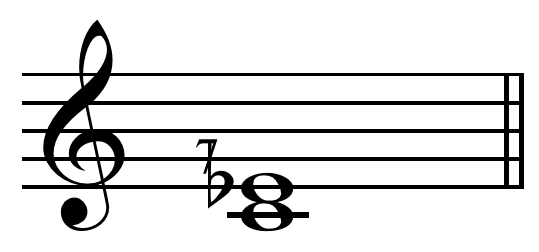
Septimal minor third on C

7-limit is a musical tuning where the largest prime number factor of the interval ratios between pitches is seven. The only primes available in septimal tuning are 2, 3, 5, and 7. Limit is a term devised by Harry Partch.

== History ==
In the 2nd century, Ptolemy described the septimal intervals: 21/20, 7/4, 8/7, 7/6, 9/7, 12/7, 7/5, and 10/7. Archytas of Tarantum is the oldest recorded musicologist to calculate 7-limit tuning systems. Those considering 7 to be consonant include Marin Mersenne, Giuseppe Tartini, Leonhard Euler, François-Joseph Fétis, J. A. Serre, Moritz Hauptmann, Alexander John Ellis, Wilfred Perrett, Max Friedrich Meyer. Those considering 7 to be dissonant include Gioseffo Zarlino, René Descartes, Jean-Philippe Rameau, Hermann von Helmholtz, Arthur von Oettingen, Hugo Riemann, Colin Brown, and Paul Hindemith ("chaos").

Claudius Ptolemy of Alexandria described several 7-limit tuning systems for the diatonic and chromatic genera. He describes several "soft" (μαλακός) diatonic tunings which all use 7-limit intervals. One, called by Ptolemy the "tonic diatonic," is ascribed to the Pythagorean philosopher and statesman Archytas of Tarentum. It used the following tetrachord: 28:27, 8:7, 9:8. Ptolemy also shares the "soft diatonic" according to peripatetic philosopher Aristoxenus of Tarentum: 20:19, 38:35, 7:6. Ptolemy offers his own "soft diatonic" as the best alternative to Archytas and Aristoxenus, with a tetrachord of: 21:20, 10:9, 8:7.

Ptolemy also describes a "tense chromatic" tuning that utilizes the following tetrachord: 22:21, 12:11, 7:6.

== Usage ==
The lesser just minor seventh, 16:9 is a 3-limit ratio, the harmonic seventh has the ratio 7:4 and is thus a septimal interval. Similarly, the septimal chromatic semitone, 21:20, is a septimal interval as 21÷7=3. The harmonic seventh is used in the barbershop seventh chord and music. Compositions with septimal tunings include La Monte Young's The Well-Tuned Piano, Ben Johnston's String Quartet No. 4, Lou Harrison's Incidental Music for Corneille's Cinna, and Michael Harrison's Revelation: Music in Pure Intonation.

Great Highland bagpipe tuning can be described as a seven tone 7-limit scale. The instrument's drone is a slightly sharper A than standard. The scale ratios are (7:8), 1:1(A), 9:8, 5:4, 4:3, 3:2, 5:3, 7:4, (2:1).

== Lattice and tonality diamond ==
The 7-limit tonality diamond:

			7/4
		3/2		7/5
	5/4		6/5		7/6
1/1		1/1		1/1		1/1
	8/5		5/3		12/7
		4/3		10/7
			8/7

This diamond contains four identities (1, 3, 5, 7 [P8, P5, M3, H7]). Similarly, the 2,3,5,7 pitch lattice contains four identities and thus 3-4 axes, but a potentially infinite number of pitches. LaMonte Young created a lattice containing only identities 3 and 7, thus requiring only two axes, for The Well-Tuned Piano.

=== Approximation using equal temperament ===
It is possible to approximate 7-limit music using equal temperament, for example 31-ET.

Fraction	Cents	Degree (31-ET)	Name (31-ET)
1/1	0	0	C
8/7	231.174	6	D
7/6	266.871	7	D♯
6/5	315.641	8	E♭
5/4	386.314	10	E
4/3	498.045	13	F
7/5	582.512	15	F♯
10/7	617.488	16	G♭
3/2	701.955	18	G
8/5	814.686	21	A♭
5/3	884.359	23	A
12/7	933.129	24	A
7/4	968.826	25	A♯
2/1	1200	31	C

== See also ==
- Đàn bầu
