= Subminor and supermajor =

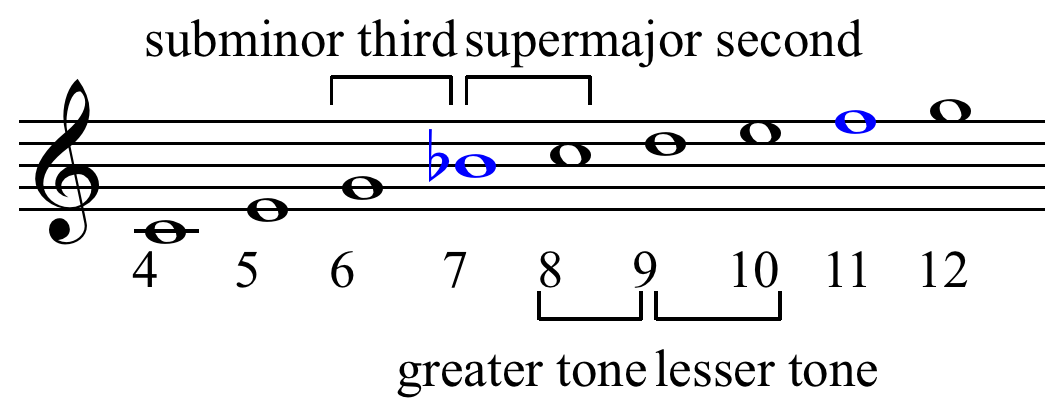
Origin of large and small seconds and thirds (including 7:6) in harmonic series.

In music, a subminor interval is an interval that is noticeably wider than a diminished interval but noticeably narrower than a minor interval. It is found in between a minor and diminished interval, thus making it below, or subminor to, the minor interval. A supermajor interval is a musical interval that is noticeably wider than a major interval but noticeably narrower than an augmented interval. It is found in between a major and augmented interval, thus making it above, or supermajor to, the major interval. The inversion of a supermajor interval is a subminor interval, and there are four major and four minor intervals, allowing for eight supermajor and subminor intervals, each with variants.

	diminished	subminor	minor	neutral	major	supermajor	augmented
seconds	D	≊ D	D♭	D	D	≊ D	D♯
thirds	E	≊ E	E♭	E	E	≊ E	E♯
sixths	A	≊ A	A♭	A	A	≊ A	A♯
sevenths	B	≊ B	B♭	B	B	≊ B	B♯

Traditionally, "supermajor and subminor, [are] the names given to certain thirds [9:7 and 7:6] found in the justly intoned scale with a natural or subminor seventh."

== Subminor second and supermajor seventh ==
Thus, a subminor second is intermediate between a minor second and a diminished second (enharmonic to unison). An example of such an interval is the ratio 26:25, or 67.90 cents (D-). Another example is the ratio 28:27, or 62.96 cents (C♯-).

A supermajor seventh is an interval intermediate between a major seventh and an augmented seventh. It is the inverse of a subminor second. Examples of such an interval is the ratio 25:13, or 1132.10 cents (B♯); the ratio 27:14, or 1137.04 cents (B); and 35:18, or 1151.23 cents (C).

== Subminor third and supermajor sixth ==
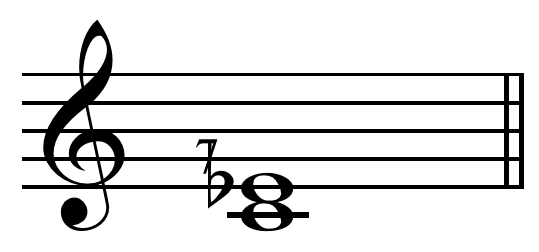
Septimal minor third on C

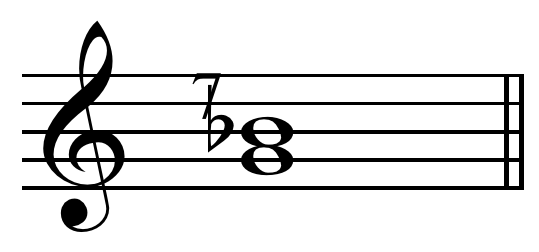
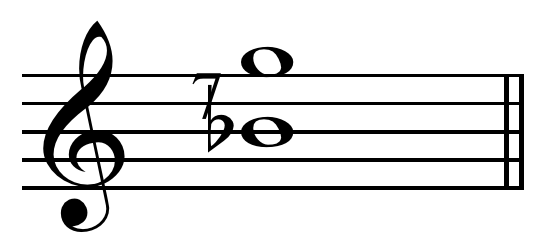
Subminor third on G and its inverse, the supermajor sixth on B♭

A subminor third is in between a minor third and a diminished third. An example of such an interval is the ratio 7:6 (E♭), or 266.87 cents, the septimal minor third, the inverse of the supermajor sixth. Another example is the ratio 13:11, or 289.21 cents (E↓♭).

A supermajor sixth is noticeably wider than a major sixth but noticeably narrower than an augmented sixth, and may be a just interval of 12:7 (A). In 24 equal temperament A = B. The septimal major sixth is an interval of 12:7 ratio (A), or about 933 cents. It is the inversion of the 7:6 subminor third.

== Subminor sixth and supermajor third ==
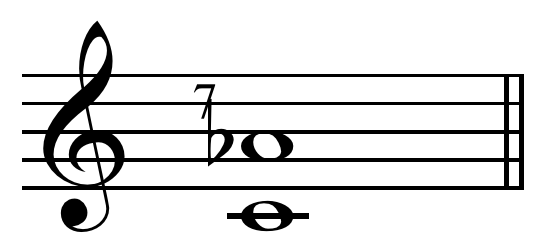
Septimal minor sixth (14/9) on C.

A subminor sixth or septimal sixth is noticeably narrower than a minor sixth but noticeably wider than a diminished sixth, enharmonically equivalent to the major fifth. The sub-minor sixth is an interval of a 14:9 ratio (A♭) or alternately 11:7. (G↑-) The 21st subharmonic (see subharmonic) is 729.22 cents.

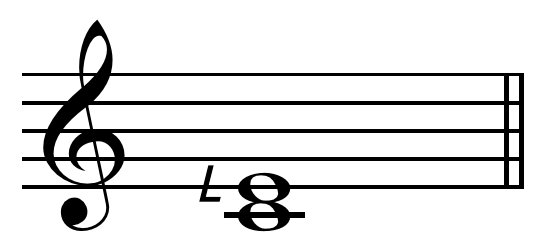
Septimal major third on C

A supermajor third is in between a major third and an augmented third, enharmonically equivalent to the minor fourth. An example of such an interval is the ratio 9:7, or 435.08 cents, the septimal major third (E). Another example is the ratio 50:39, or 430.14 cents (E♯).

== Subminor seventh and supermajor second ==
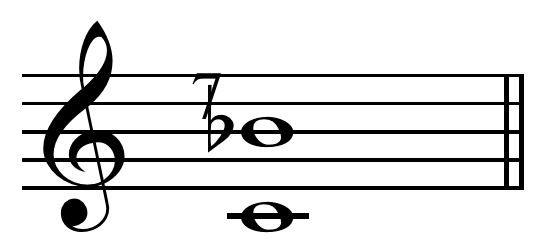
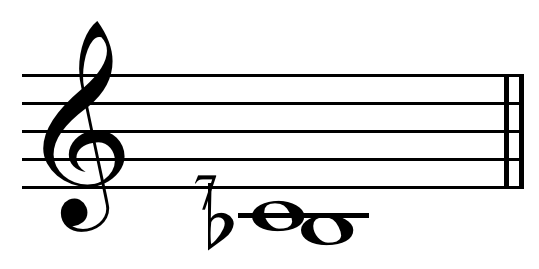
Harmonic seventh and its inverse, the septimal whole tone

A subminor seventh is an interval between a minor seventh and a diminished seventh. An example of such an interval is the 7:4 ratio, the harmonic seventh (B♭).

A supermajor second (or supersecond) is intermediate to a major second and an augmented second. An example of such an interval is the ratio 8:7, or 231.17 cents, also known as the septimal whole tone (D-) and the inverse of the subminor seventh. Another example is the ratio 15:13, or 247.74 cents (D♯).

== Use ==
Composer Lou Harrison was fascinated with the 7:6 subminor third and 8:7 supermajor second, using them in pieces such as Concerto for Piano with Javanese Gamelan, Cinna for tack-piano, and Strict Songs (for voices and orchestra). Together the two produce the 4:3 just perfect fourth.

19 equal temperament has several intervals which are simultaneously subminor, supermajor, augmented, and diminished, due to tempering and enharmonic equivalence (both of which work differently in 19-ET than standard tuning). For example, four steps of 19-ET (an interval of roughly 253 cents) is all of the following: subminor third, supermajor second, augmented second, and diminished third.

== See also ==
- Major fourth and minor fifth
- Neutral interval
- Quarter tone
