= Minor sixth =

- Inverse: Major third

Name
- Abbreviation: m6

Tuning
- 12 equal temperament: 8 semitones (800 cents)
- Pythagorean tuning: 128:81 (~792.18 cents)
- 5-limit tuning: 8:5 (~813.69 cents)
- 11-limit tuning: 11:7 (~782.49 cents)

In music theory, a minor sixth is a musical interval encompassing six staff positions (see Interval number for more details), and is one of two commonly occurring sixths (the other one being the major sixth). It is qualified as minor because it is the smaller of the two: the minor sixth spans eight semitones, the major sixth nine. For example, the interval from A to F is a minor sixth, as the note F lies eight semitones above A, and there are six staff positions from A to F.

Diminished and augmented sixths span the same number of staff positions, but consist of a different number of semitones (seven and ten respectively).

== Equal temperament ==
In 12-tone equal temperament (12-ET), the minor sixth is enharmonically equivalent to the augmented fifth. It occurs in first inversion major and dominant seventh chords and second inversion minor chords. It is equal to eight semitones, i.e. a ratio of 2^{8/12}:1 or simplified to 2^{2/3}:1 (about 1.587), or 800 cents.

== Just intonation ==
=== Definition ===
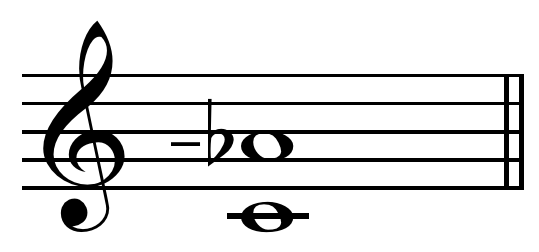
Pythagorean minor sixth on C, four Pythagorean perfect fifths.

In just intonation multiple definitions of a minor sixth can exist:

- In 3-limit tuning, i.e. Pythagorean tuning, the minor sixth is the ratio 128:81, or 792.18 cents, i.e. 7.82 cents flatter than the 12-ET-minor sixth. This is denoted with a "−" (minus) sign (see figure).
- In 5-limit tuning, a minor sixth most often corresponds to a pitch ratio of 8:5 or 814 cents; i.e. 13.7 cents sharper than the 12-ET-minor sixth.
- In 11-limit tuning, the 11:7 undecimal minor sixth is 782.49 cents.

=== Consonance ===
The minor sixth is one of consonances of common practice music, along with the unison, octave, perfect fifth, major and minor thirds, major sixth and (sometimes) the perfect fourth. In the common practice period, sixths were considered interesting and dynamic consonances along with their inverses the thirds, but in medieval times they were considered dissonances unusable in a stable final sonority. In that period they were tuned to the flatter Pythagorean minor sixth of 128:81. In 5-limit just intonation, the minor sixth of 8:5 is classed as a consonance.

Any note will only appear in major scales from any of its minor sixth major scale notes (for example, C is the minor sixth note from E and E will only appear in C, D, E, F, G, A and B major scales).

=== Subminor sixth ===
subminor sixth
- Inverse: supermajor third

Name
- Abbreviation: m6

Size
- Semitones: 8
- Interval class: 4
- Just interval: 14:9 or 63:40

Cents
- Equal temperament: 800
- 24-Tone equal temperament: 750
- Just intonation: 765 or 786

In addition, the subminor sixth, is a subminor interval which includes ratios such as 14:9 and 63:40. of 764.9 cents or 786.4 cents respectively.

== See also ==
- Musical tuning
- List of meantone intervals
- Sixth chord
- 833 cents scale (golden ratio = 833.09 cents)
