= Neutral third =

- Inverse: neutral sixth

Name
- Other names: –
- Abbreviation: n3

Size
- Semitones: ~3½
- Interval class: ~3½
- Just interval: 11:9, 27:22, or 16:13

Cents
- 24-Tone equal temperament: 350
- Just intonation: 347, 355, or 359

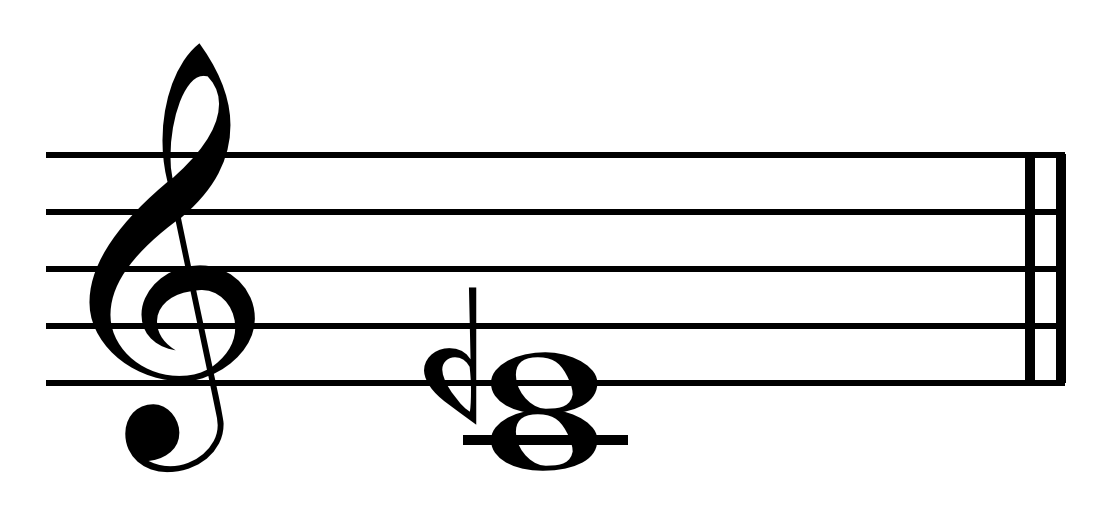
Neutral third on C 27/22

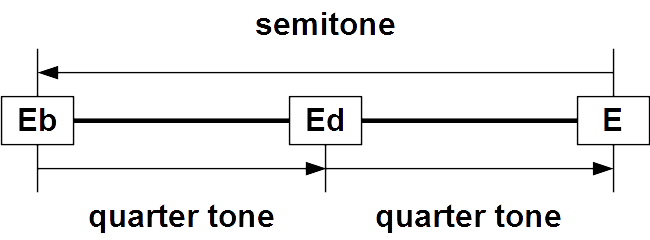
Neutral third

A neutral third, (also known as a submajor third, or a superminor third), is a musical interval wider than a minor third but narrower than a major third. It is called the neutral third in 24-Tone Equal Temperament, and the submajor third, or the superminor third, in Just Intonation. It was named neutral third by Jan Pieter Land in 1880. Land makes reference to the neutral third attributed to Zalzal (8th c.), described by Al-Farabi (10th c.) as corresponding to a ratio of 27:22 (354.5 cents) and by Avicenna (Ibn Sina, 11th c.) as 39:32 (342.5 cents). The Zalzalian third may have been a mobile interval.

Three distinct intervals may be termed neutral thirds:

- The undecimal neutral third, (also known as the undecimal submajor third, undecimal superminor third, submajor third, superminor third, just undecimal neutral third, just undecimal submajor third, or just undecimal superminor third), has a ratio of 11:9 between the frequencies of the two tones, or about 347.41 cents. This ratio is the mathematical mediant of the major third 5/4 and the minor third 6/5, and as such, has the property that if harmonic notes of frequency f and (11/9) f are played together, the beat frequency of the 5th harmonic of the lower pitch against the 4th of the upper, i.e. $|5 f - 4 (11/9) f| = (1/9) f$, is the same as the beat frequency of the 6th harmonic of the lower pitch against the 5th of the upper, i.e. $|6 f - 5 (11/9) f| = |-(1/9) f| = (1/9) f$. In this sense, it is the unique ratio which is equally well-tuned as a major and minor third.
- A tridecimal neutral third has a ratio of 16:13 between the frequencies of the two tones, or about 359.47 cents. This is the largest neutral third, and occurs infrequently in music, as little music utilizes the 13th harmonic. It is the mediant of the septimal major third 9/7 and septimal minor third 7/6, and as such, enjoys an analogous property with regard to the beating of the corresponding harmonics as above. That is, $|7 f - 6 (16/13) f| = |9 f - 7 (16/13) f| = (5/13) f$.
- An equal-tempered neutral third is characterized by a difference of 350 cents between the two tones, slightly wider than the 11:9 ratio, and exactly half of an equal-tempered perfect fifth.

These intervals are all within about 12 cents and are difficult for most people to distinguish by ear. Neutral thirds are roughly a quarter tone sharp from 12 equal temperament minor thirds and a quarter tone flat from 12-ET major thirds. In just intonation, as well as in tunings such as 31-ET, 41-ET, or 72-ET, which more closely approximate just intonation, the intervals are closer together.

In addition to the above examples, a square root neutral third can be characterized by a ratio of $\sqrt{3/2}$ between two frequencies, being exactly half of a just perfect fifth of 3/2 and measuring about 350.98 cents. Such a definition stems from the two thirds traditionally making a fifth-based triad.

A triad formed by two neutral thirds is neither major nor minor, thus the neutral thirds triad is ambiguous. While it is not found in twelve tone equal temperament it is found in others such as the quarter tone scale and 31-tet.

== Occurrence in human music ==
=== In infants' song ===
Infants experiment with singing, and a few studies of individual infants' singing found that neutral thirds regularly arise in their improvisations. In two separate case studies of the progression and development of these improvisations, neutral thirds were found to arise in infants' songs after major and minor seconds and thirds, but before intervals smaller than a semitone and also before intervals as large as a perfect fourth or larger.

=== In modern classical Western music ===
The neutral third has been used by a number of modern composers, including Charles Ives, James Tenney, and Gayle Young.

=== In traditional music ===
Claudius Ptolemy describes an "even diatonic" tuning which uses two justly tuned neutral thirds in Harmonikon built off the 12:11 and 11:10 neutral seconds in compound intervals with 9:8 and 10:9 whole tones, forming the intervals: (12/11)*(9/8) = 27/22, (11/10)*(10/9) = 11/9. The latter of these is an interval found in the harmonic series as the interval between partials 9 and 11.

The equal-tempered neutral third may be found in the quarter tone scale and in some traditional Arab music (see also Arab tone system). Undecimal neutral thirds appear in traditional Georgian music. Neutral thirds are also found in American folk music.

=== In contemporary popular music ===
Blue notes (a note found in country music, blues, and some rock music) on the third note of a scale can be seen as a variant of a neutral third with the tonic, as they fall in between a major third and a minor third. Similarly the blue note on the seventh note of the scale can be seen as a neutral third with the dominant.

== In equal temperaments ==
Two steps of seven-tone equal temperament form an interval of 342.8571 cents, which is within 5 cents of 347.4079 for the undecimal (11:9) neutral third. This is an equal temperament in reasonably common use, at least in the form of "near seven equal", as it is a tuning used for Thai music as well as the Ugandan Chopi tradition of music.

The neutral third also has good approximations in other commonly used equal temperaments including 24-ET (7 steps, 350 cents) and similarly by all multiples of 24 equal steps such as 48-ET and 72-ET, 31-ET (9 steps, 348.39), 34-ET (10 steps, 352.941 cents), 41-ET (12 steps, 351.22 cents), and slightly less closely by 53-ET (15 steps, 339.62 cents).

Close approximations to the tridecimal neutral third (16:13) appear in 53-ET and 72-ET. Both of these temperaments distinguish between the tridecimal (16:13) and undecimal (11:9) neutral thirds. All the other tuning systems mentioned above fail to distinguish between these intervals; they temper out the comma 144:143.

== See also ==
- List of pitch intervals
- Microtonal music
