= Septimal diatonic semitone =

Major diatonic semitone
- Inverse: major seventh

Name
- Other names: Septimal diatonic semitone

Size
- Semitones: 1
- Interval class: 1
- Just interval: 15:14

Cents
- 12-Tone equal temperament: 100
- 24-Tone equal temperament: 100
- Just intonation: 119.44

In music, a septimal diatonic semitone (or major diatonic semitone) is the interval 15:14. It is about 119.44 cents. The septimal diatonic semitone may be derived from the harmonic series as the interval between the fourteenth and fifteenth harmonics (B7b and B).

The septimal diatonic semitone equals a just diatonic semitone (16:15, or 111.73 cents) plus a septimal kleisma (the interval 225:224, or 7.71 cents).

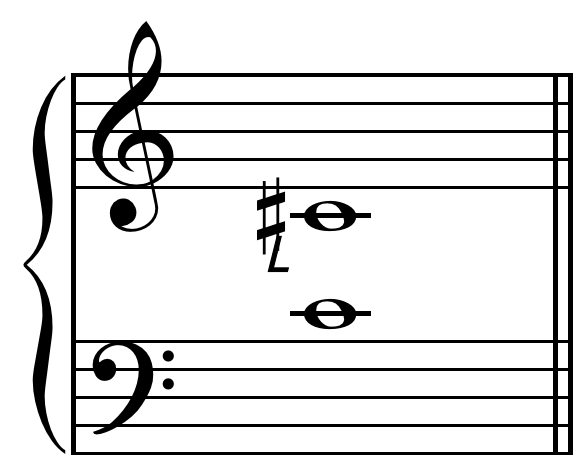
Septimal diatonic semitone (15/14) on C

== See also ==
- Major diatonic semitone (5-limit, 16:15)
- Minor diatonic semitone (or septendecimal diatonic semitone, 17:16).
