= Septimal minor third =

- Inverse: Septimal major sixth

Name
- Other names: Subminor third, Septimal subminor third
- Abbreviation: s3, sm3

Size
- Semitones: 2 2/3
- Interval class: ~2 1/2
- Just interval: 7/6

Cents
- Equal temperament: 300
- 24-Tone equal temperament: 250
- Just intonation: 267

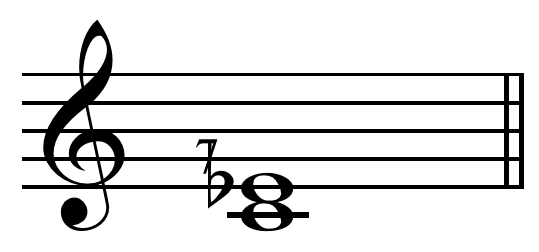
Septimal minor third on C

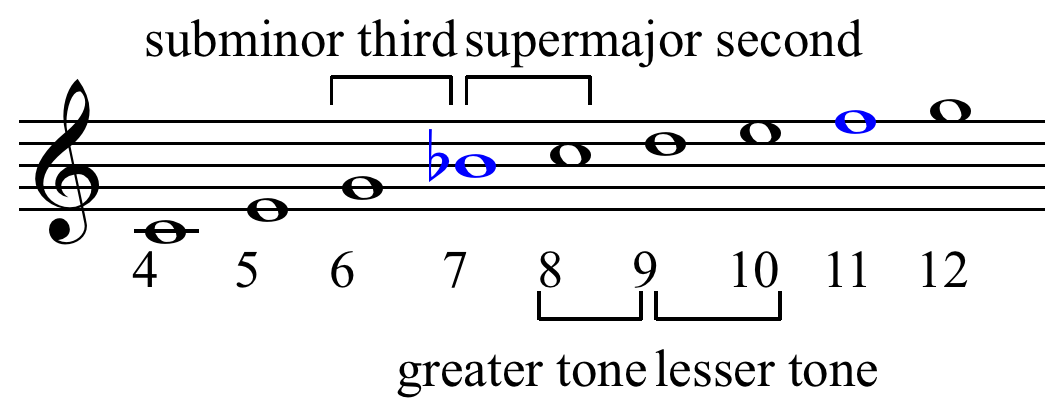
Origin of large and small seconds and thirds in harmonic series.

In music, the septimal minor third, also called the subminor third (e.g., by Ellis) or septimal subminor third, is the musical interval exactly or approximately equal to a 7/6 frequency ratio. In terms of cents, it is 267 cents, a quartertone of size 36/35 flatter than a 6/5 just minor third. In 24 tone equal temperament five quarter tones approximate the septimal minor third at 250 cents. A septimal minor third is almost exactly two-ninths of an octave, and thus all divisions of the octave into multiples of nine (72 equal temperament being the most notable) have an almost perfect match to this interval. The septimal major sixth, 12/7, is the inverse of this interval.

The septimal minor third may be derived in the harmonic series from the seventh harmonic, and as such is in inharmonic ratios with all notes in the regular 12 TET scale, with the exception of the fundamental and the octave. (Note: Among the most striking intervals are ... the narrow 7:6 subminor third ... . The seventh harmonic ... was problematic in all Western tuning systems. The interval it forms with the sixth harmonic [7:6 subminor third] is smaller than a minor third but larger than a major second. To cite a specific example: The seventh harmonic of C lies partway between A and B flat. Sounding with the sixth harmonic (G), it forms a 7:6 subminor third of 267 cents – 33 cents smaller than the equal-tempered minor third, itself 16 cents smaller than the pure 6:5 minor third. This 7:6 interval is thus nearly a quarter tone smaller than the pure minor third (33 + 16 = 49 cents). — Miller & Lieberman (2006), p. 71) It has a darker but generally pleasing character when compared to the 6/5 third. A triad formed by using it in place of the minor third is called a "septimal minor" or "subminor triad".

In the meantone era the interval made its appearance as the alternative minor third in remote keys, under the name augmented second. Tunings of the meantone fifth in the neighborhood of quarter-comma meantone will give three septimal minor thirds among the twelve minor thirds of the tuning; since the wolf fifth appears with an ordinary minor third, this entails there are three septimal minor triads, eight ordinary minor triads and one triad containing the wolf fifth arising from an ordinary minor third followed by a septimal major third.

Composer Ben Johnston uses a small "7" as an accidental to indicate a note is lowered 49 cents, or an upside down seven ("ㄥ") to indicate a note is raised 49 cents.

The position of this note also appears on the scale of the Moodswinger. Yuri Landman indicated the harmonic positions of his instrument in a color dotted series. The septimal minor third position is cyan blue as well as the other knotted positions of the seventh harmonic (5/7, (Note: Note that the ratios expressed in terms of string ratios are inverted with regards to frequency ratios: Read "5/7" as the 7/5 frequency ratio, "4/7" as the 7/4 frequency ratio (7th harmonic), etc.) 4/7, 3/7, 2/7 and 1/7 of the string length of the open string).

== In equal temperament and non-Western scales ==
Twelve-tone equal temperament (12 TET), as commonly used in Western music, does not provide a good approximation for this interval, and quarter tones (24 TET) do not match it well either. 19 TET, 22 TET, 31 TET, 41 TET, and 72 TET each offer successively better matches (measured in cents difference) to this interval.

Septimal minor third (just intonation, 7:6 ratio)
Sawtooth wave
A 440 sawtooth wave, followed by 513.333 Hz, followed by both tones together

Sine wave
A 880 sine wave, followed by 1026.67 Hz, followed by both tones together, followed by the implied root frequency of 586.67 Hz, a fifth below the A

Several non-Western and just intonation tunings, such as the 43 tone scale developed by Harry Partch, do feature the (exact) septimal minor third.

== Listening ==
Because of its position in the harmonic series, the sixth harmonic (frequency ratio 6/1) being a perfect fifth and two octaves above the root, the septimal minor third implies a difference tone a perfect fifth below the lower note in the interval. Depending on the timbre of the pitches, humans sometimes perceive this root pitch even if it is not played. The phenomenon of hearing this root pitch is evident in the following sound file, which uses a pure sine wave. For comparison, the root pitch is played after the interval has been played.
