= Septimal major third =

- Inverse: septimal minor sixth

Name
- Other names: Supermajor third, Septimal supermajor third
- Abbreviation: S3, SM3

Size
- Semitones: ~4½
- Interval class: ~4½
- Just interval: 9:7

Cents
- 12-Tone equal temperament: 400
- 24-Tone equal temperament: 450
- Just intonation: 435

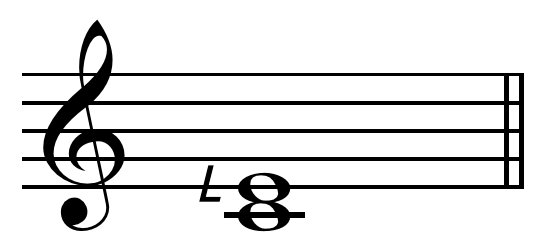
9/7 major third from C to E This, "extremely large third", is also found between C and E and may resemble a neutral third or blue note.

In music, the septimal major third, also called the supermajor third (by Hermann von Helmholtz among others), septimal supermajor third, and sometimes Bohlen–Pierce third is the musical interval exactly or approximately equal to a just 9:7 ratio of frequencies, or alternately 14:11. It is equal to 435 cents, sharper than a just major third (5:4) by the septimal quarter tone (36:35). In 24-TET the septimal major third is approximated by 9 quarter tones, or 450 cents. Both 24 and 19 equal temperament map the septimal major third and the septimal narrow fourth (21:16) to the same interval.

This interval has a characteristic brassy sound which is much less sweet than a pure major third, but is classed as a 9-limit consonance. Together with the root 1:1 and the perfect fifth of 3:2, it makes up the septimal major triad, or septimal supermajor triad. However, in terms of the overtone series, this is a utonal rather than otonal chord, being an inverted 6:7:9, i.e. a 9/9:9/7:9/6 chord. The septimal major triad can also be represented by the ratio 14:18:21. The septimal major triad contains an interval of a septimal minor third between its third and fifth ( 3:2 / 9:7 = 7:6 ). Similarly, the septimal major third is the interval between the third and the fifth of the septimal minor triad.

In the early meantone era the interval made its appearance as the alternative major third in remote keys, under the name diminished fourth. Tunings of the meantone fifth in the neighborhood of Zarlino's 2/7-comma meantone will give four septimal thirds among the twelve major thirds of the tuning; this entails that three septimal major triads appear along with one chord containing a septimal major third with an ordinary minor third above it, making up a wolf fifth.

22 equal temperament has a very close match to this interval. In this temperament, four fifths minus two octaves equals a septimal major third, not an ordinary major third.
