= Dynamic tonality =

Real-time changes of tuning and timbre

Dynamic tonality is a paradigm for tuning and timbre which generalizes the special relationship between just intonation and the harmonic series to apply to a wider set of pseudo-just tunings and related pseudo-harmonic timbres.

The main limitation of dynamic tonality is that it is best used with compatible isomorphic keyboard instruments and compatible synthesizers, or with voices and instruments whose sounds are transformed in real time via compatible digital tools.

== The static timbre paradigm ==
=== Harmonic timbres ===
A vibrating string, a column of air, and the human voice all emit a specific pattern of partials corresponding to the harmonic series. The degree of correspondence varies, depending on the physical characteristics of the emitter. "Partials" are also called "harmonics" or "overtones". Each musical instrument's unique sound is called its timbre, so an instrument's timbre can be called a "harmonic timbre" if its partials correspond closely to the harmonic series.

=== Just tunings ===
Just intonation is a system of tuning that adjusts a tuning's notes to maximize their alignment with a harmonic timbre's partials. This alignment maximizes the consonance of music's tonal intervals.

=== Temperament ===
The harmonic series and just intonation share an infinitely complicated – or infinite rank – pattern that is determined by the infinite series of prime numbers. A temperament is an attempt to reduce this complexity by mapping this rank-∞ pattern to a simpler, finite-rank pattern.

Throughout history, the pattern of notes in a tuning could be altered (that is, "tempered") by humans but the pattern of partials sounded by an acoustic musical instrument was largely determined by the physics of their sound production. The resulting misalignment between "pseudo-just" tempered tunings, and untempered timbres, made temperament "a battleground for the great minds of Western civilization". This misalignment, in any tuning that is not fully Just (and hence infinitely complex), is the defining characteristic of any static timbre paradigm.

=== Instruments ===
Many of the pseudo-just temperaments proposed during this "temperament battle" were rank 2 (two-dimensional) – such as quarter-comma meantone – that provided more than 12 notes per octave. However, the standard piano-like keyboard is only rank 1 (one-dimensional), affording at most 12 notes per octave. Piano-like keyboards affording more than 12 notes per octave were developed by Vicentino, Colonna, Mersenne, Huygens, and Newton, but were all considered too cumbersome / too difficult to play.

== The dynamic tonality paradigm ==
The goal of dynamic tonality is to enable consonance beyond the range of tunings and temperaments in which harmonic timbres have traditionally been played. Dynamic tonality delivers consonance by tempering the intervals between notes (into "pseudo-just tunings") and also tempering the intervals between partials (into "pseudo-harmonic timbres") through digital synthesis and/or processing. Aligning the notes of a pseudo-just tuning's notes and the partials of a pseudo-harmonic timbre (or vice versa) enables consonance.

The defining characteristic of dynamic tonality is that a given rank-2 temperament (as defined by a period α, a generator β, and a comma sequence) is used to generate, in real time during performance, the same set of intervals among:

1. A pseudo-just tuning's notes;
2. A pseudo-harmonic timbre's partials; and
3. An isomorphic keyboard's note-controlling buttons.

Generating all three from the same temperament solves two problems and creates (at least) three opportunities.

1. Dynamic tonality solves the problem of maximizing the consonance of tempered tunings, and extends that solution across a wider range of tunings than were previously considered to be consonant.
2. Dynamic Tonality solves the "cumbersome" problem cited by Isacoff by generating a keyboard that is (a) isomorphic with its temperament (in every octave, key, and tuning), and yet is (b) tiny (the size of the keyboards on squeezeboxes such as concertinas, bandoneons, and bayans). The creators of dynamic tonality could find no evidence that any of Isacoff's Great Minds knew about isomorphic keyboards or recognized the connection between the rank of a temperament and the dimensions of a keyboard.
3. Dynamic tonality gives musicians the opportunity to explore new musical effects (see "New musical effects," below).
4. Dynamic tonality creates the opportunity for musicians to explore rank-2 temperaments other than the syntonic temperament (such as schismatic, Magic, and miracle) easily and with maximum consonance.
5. Dynamic tonality creates the opportunity for a significant increase in the efficiency of music education.

A rank-2 temperament defines a rank-2 (two-dimensional) note space, as shown in video 1 (note space).

Video 1: generating a rank-2 note space

The syntonic temperament is a rank-2 temperament defined by its period (just perfect octave, 1/2), its generator (just perfect fifth, 3/2) and its comma sequence (which starts with the syntonic comma, 81/80, which names the temperament). The construction of the syntonic temperament's note-space is shown in video 2 (Syntonic note-space).

Video 2: generating the syntonic temperament's note space

The valid tuning range of the syntonic temperament is show in Figure 1.

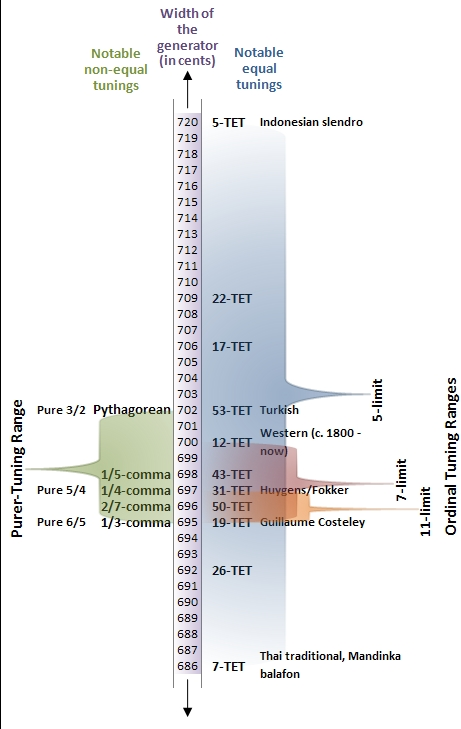
Figure 1: The valid tuning range of the syntonic temperament, noting its valid tuning ranges at different p-limits and some notable tunings within those ranges.

A keyboard that is generated by a temperament is said to be isomorphic with that temperament (from the Greek "iso" meaning "same", and "morph" meaning "shape"). Isomorphic keyboards are also known as generalized keyboards. Isomorphic keyboards have the unique properties of transpositional invariance and tuning invariance when used with rank-2 temperaments of just intonation. That is, such keyboards expose a given musical interval with "the same shape" in every octave of every key of every tuning of such a temperament.

Of the various isomorphic keyboards now known (e.g., the Bosanquet, Janko, Fokker, and Wesley), the Wicki-Hayden keyboard is optimal for dynamic tonality across the entire valid 5-limit tuning range of the syntonic temperament. The isomorphic keyboard shown in this article's videos is the Wicki-Hayden keyboard, for that reason. It also has symmetries related to Diatonic Set Theory, as shown in Video 3 (Same shape).

Video 3: Same shape in every octave, key, and tuning

The Wicki-Hayden keyboard embodies a tonnetz, as shown in video 4 (tonnetz). The tonnetz is a lattice diagram representing tonal space first described by Euler (1739), which is a central feature of Neo-Riemannian music theory.

Video 4: the keyboard generated by the syntonic temperament embodies a tonnetz.

=== Non-Western tunings ===
The endpoints of the valid 5 limit tuning range of the syntonic temperament, shown in Figure 1, are:

- Perfect 5 = 686 cents (7 TET): The minor second is as wide as the major second, so the diatonic scale is a seven-note whole tone scale. This is the traditional tuning of the traditional Thai ranat ek, in which the ranat's inharmonic timbre is maximally consonant. Other non-Western musical cultures are also reported to tune their instruments in 7 TET, including the Mandinka balafon.
- Perfect 5 = 720 cents (5 TET): The minor second has zero width, so the diatonic scale is a five-note whole tone scale. This is arguably the slendro scale of Java's gamelan orchestras, with which the gamelan's inharmonic timbres are maximally consonant.

=== Dynamic timbres ===
The partials of a pseudo-harmonic timbre are digitally mapped, as defined by a temperament, to specific notes of a pseudo-just tuning. When the temperament's generator changes in width, the tuning of the temperament's notes changes, and the partials change along with those notes – yet their relative position remains invariant on the temperament-generated isomorphic keyboard. The frequencies of notes and partials change with the generator's width, but the relationships among the notes, partials, and note-controlling buttons remain the same: as defined by the temperament. The mapping of partials to the notes of the syntonic temperament is animated in video 5.

Video 5: Animates the mapping of partials to notes in accordance with the syntonic temperament.

=== Dynamic tuning ===
On an isomorphic keyboard, any given musical structure—a scale, a chord, a chord progression, or an entire song—has exactly the same fingering in every tuning of a given temperament. This allows a performer to learn to play a song in one tuning of a given temperament and then to play it with exactly the same finger-movements, on exactly the same note-controlling buttons, in every other tuning of that temperament. See video 3 (Same shape).

For example, one could learn to play Rodgers and Hammerstein's "Do-Re-Mi" song in its original 12 tone equal temperament (12 tet) and then play it with exactly the same finger-movements, on exactly the same note-controlling buttons, while smoothly changing the tuning in real time across the syntonic temperament's tuning continuum.

The process of digitally tempering a pseudo-harmonic timbre's partials to align with a tempered pseudo-just tuning's notes is shown in video 6 (Dynamic tuning & timbre).

Video 6: Dynamic tuning & timbre.

=== New musical effects ===
Dynamic Tonality enables two new kinds of real-time musical effects:

- Tuning-based effects, that require a change in tuning, and
- Timbre-based effects, that affect the distribution of energy among a pseudo-harmonic timbre's partials.

==== Tuning-based effects ====
Dynamic Tonality's novel tuning-based effects include:

- Polyphonic tuning bends, in which the pitch of the tonic remains fixed while the pitches of all other notes change to reflect changes in the tuning, with notes that are close to the tonic in tonal space changing pitch only slightly and those that are distant changing considerably;
- New chord progressions that start in a first tuning, change to second tuning (to progress across a comma which the second tuning tempers out but the first tuning does not), optionally change to subsequent tunings for similar reasons, and then conclude in the first tuning; and
- Temperament modulations, which start in a first tuning of a first temperament, change to a second tuning of the first temperament which is also a first tuning of a second temperament (a "pivot tuning"), change note-selection among enharmonics to reflect the second temperament, change to a second tuning of the second temperament, then optionally change to additional tunings and temperaments before returning through the pivot tuning to the first tuning of the first temperament. An example would be:
  - Starting a song in quarter-comma meantone (P5=696.6, in which P5="tempered Perfect Fifth", the width of the temperament's generator, measured in cents; see Figure 1); then
  - Changing the tuning to 12-Tone Equal Temperament (12-TET, P5=700) for use as a pivot tuning, then
  - Keeping the same 12-TET tuning but changing one's note-choices
    - From the meantone temperament (in which the fundamental's 5th partial is mapped to the Major Third, such that the major triad on C is played C-E-G)
    - To the schismatic temperament (in which the 5th partial is mapped to the Diminished Fourth, such that the major triad on C is played C-F♭-G), then
  - Tuning from 12-TET (P5=700) up to P5=701.71, and continuing to play with the schismatic temperament's note-choices, before
  - Returning to the "home" quarter-comma meantone tuning, temperament, and note-choices via the 12-TET pivot tuning.
  - The fact that the Major Third and Diminished Fourth are enharmonic in 12-TET – enabling the fundamental's 5th partial to be sounded by either interval – is what makes 12-TET suitable as a pivot tuning between the syntonic and schismatic temperaments.
  - At both endpoints of this temperament modulation (syntonic, P5=696.6; and schismatic, P5=701.71), the 5th partial is exactly the just 5:4 ratio (386.31 cents) above its fundamental, as per the Harmonic Series, via different intervals (syntonic, Major Third; schismatic, Diminished Fourth).

==== Timbre-based effects ====
The developers of dynamic tonality have invented novel vocabulary to describe the effects on timbre by raising or lowering the relative amplitude of partials. Their new terms include primeness, conicality, and richness, with primeness being further subdivided into twoness, threeness, fiveness etc.:

Primeness
The overall term primeness refers to the level to which overtones or partials of the fundamental tone whose harmonic order is a multiple of some prime factor; for example:
- The order of partials 2, 4, 8, 16, ..., 2^{n} (for n = 1, 2, 3 ...) only contain the prime factor 2, so this particular set of partials is described as having twoness, only.
- The of partials numbered 3, 9, 27, ..., 3^{n} can only have their order divided evenly by the prime number 3, and so can be said to only demonstrate threeness.
- Partials of order 5, 25, 125, ..., 5^{n} can only be factored by prime 5, and so those are said to have fiveness.
Other partials' orders may be factorised by several primes: Partial 12 can be factored by both 2 and 3, and so shows both twoness and threeness; partial 15 can be factored by both 3 and 5, and so shows both threeness and fiveness. If yet another appropriately-sized comma is introduced into the syntonic temperament's sequence of commas and semitones it can provide for a 7th order/ partial (see video 5), and thus enable sevenness.
Consideration of primeness of a sound is meant to enable a musician to thoughtfully manipulate a timber by enhancing or reducing its twoness, threeness, fiveness, ..., primeness.

Conicality
Specifically turning down twoness produces timbre whose partials are predominantly odd order – a "hollow or nasal" sound reminiscent of cylindrical closed bore instruments (an ocarina, for example, or a few types of organ pipes). As the twoness increases, the even partials increase, creating a sound more reminiscent of open cylindrical bore instruments (concert flutes, for example, or shakuhachi), or conical bore instruments (bassoons, oboes, saxophones). This perceptual feature is called conicality.

Richness
The term richness is close to common use for describing sound; in this context, it means the extent to which a timbre's spectrum contains partials whose orders include many different prime factors: The more prime factors are present in the orders of a timber's loud partials, the more rich the sound is. When richness is at minimum, only the fundamental sound is present; as it is increased, the twoness is increased, then the threeness, then the fiveness, etc.

=== Superset of static timbre paradigm ===
One can use Dynamic Tonality to temper only the tuning of notes, without tempering timbres, thus embracing the Static Timbre Paradigm.

Similarly, using a synthesizer control such as the Tone Diamond, a musician can opt to maximize regularity, harmonicity, or consonance – or trade off among them in real time (with some of the jammer's 10 degrees of freedom mapped to the tone diamond's variables), with consistent fingering. This enables musicians to choose tunings that are regular or irregular, equal or non-equal, major-biased or minor-biased – and enables the musician to slide smoothly among these tuning options in real time, exploring the emotional affect of each variation and the changes among them.

=== Compared to microtonality ===
Imagine that the valid tuning range of a temperament (as defined in Dynamic Tonality) is a string, and that individual tunings are beads on that string. The microtonal community has typically focused primarily on the beads, whereas Dynamic Tonality is focused primarily on the string. Both communities care about both beads and strings; only their focus and emphasis differ.

=== Example: C2ShiningC ===
An early example of dynamic tonality can be heard in the song "C2ShiningC".

This sound example contains only one chord, C_{maj}, played throughout, yet a sense of harmonic tension is imparted by a tuning progression and a timbre progression, as follows:

C_{maj} 19 tet harmonic	⟶	C_{maj} 5 tet harmonic	⟶	C_{maj} 19 tet consonant	⟶	C_{maj} 5 tet consonant

- The timbre progresses from a harmonic timbre (with partials following the harmonic series) to a 'pseudo-harmonic' timbre (with partials adjusted to align with the notes of the current tuning) and back again.
- Twice as rapidly, the tuning progresses (via polyphonic tuning bends), within the syntonic temperament, from an initial tuning in which the tempered perfect fifth (p5) is 695 cents wide (19 tone equal temperament, 19 tet) to a second tuning in which the p5 is 720 cents wide (5 tet), and back again.

As the tuning changes, the pitches of all notes except the tonic change, and the widths of all intervals except the octave change; however, the relationships among the intervals (as defined by the syntonic temperament's period, generator, and comma sequence) remain invariant (that is, constant; not varying) throughout. This invariance among a temperament's interval relationships is what makes invariant fingering (on an isomorphic keyboard) possible, even while the tuning is changing. In the syntonic temperament, the tempered major third (M3) is as wide as four tempered perfect fifths (p5‑s) minus two octaves – so the M3's width changes across the tuning progression

- from 380 cents in 19 tet (p5 = 695 cents), where the C_{maj} triad's M3 is very close in width to its just width of 386.3 cents,
- to 480 cents in 5 tet (p5 = 720 cents), where the C_{maj} triad's M3 is close in width to a slightly flat perfect fourth of 498 cents, making the C_{maj} chord sound rather like a C^{sus 4}.

Thus, the tuning progression's widening of the C_{maj}'s M3 from a nearly just major third in 19 tet to a slightly flat perfect fourth in 5 tet creates the harmonic tension of a C^{sus 4} within a C_{maj} chord, which is relieved by the return to 19 tet. This example proves that dynamic tonality offers new means of creating and then releasing harmonic tension, even within a single chord.

This analysis is presented in C_{maj} as originally intended, despite the recording actually being in D_{maj}.

=== History ===
Dynamic tonality was developed primarily by a collaboration between William Sethares, Andrew Milne, and James ("Jim") Plamondon.

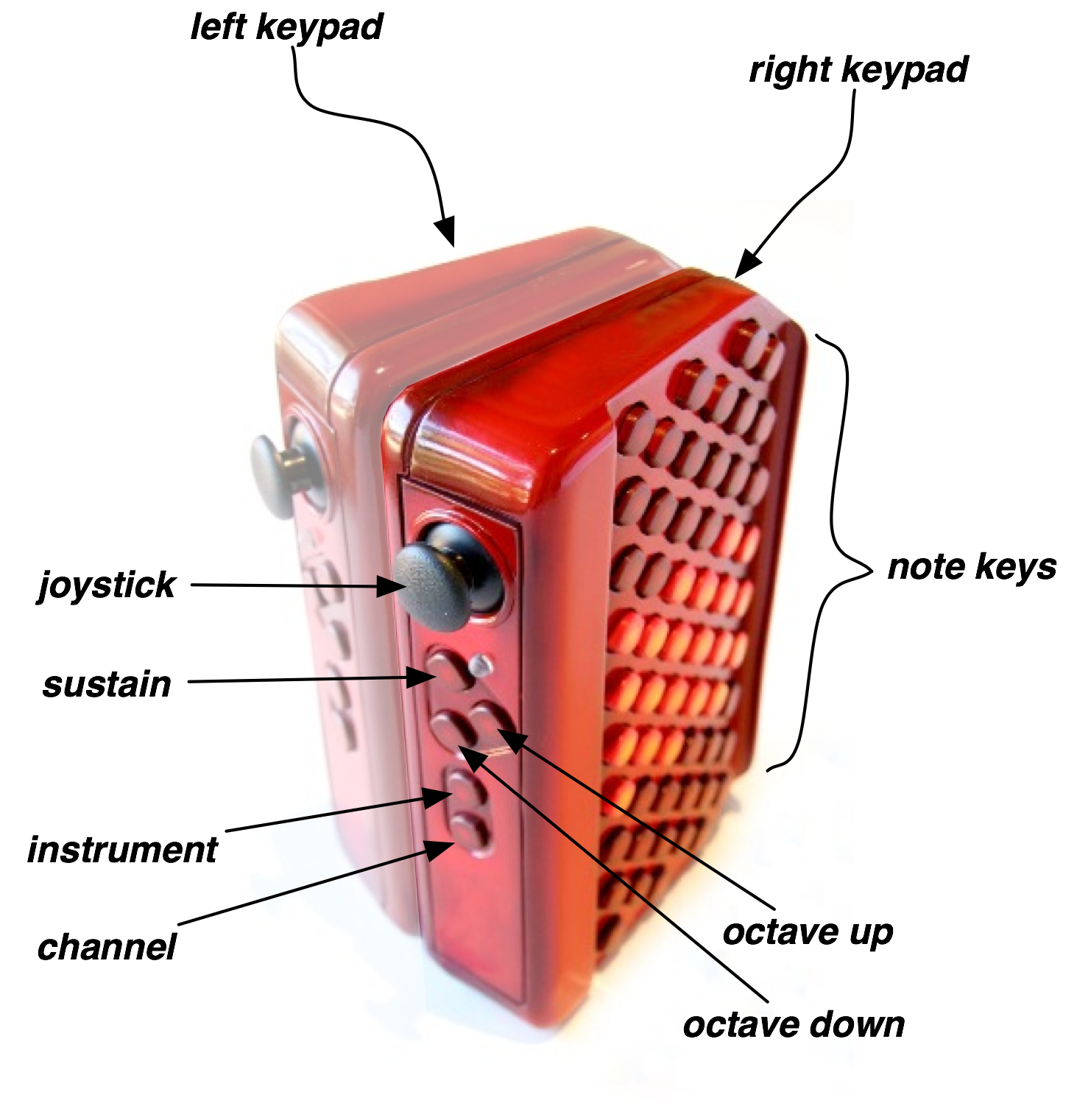
A prototype of the Thummer

The latter formed Thumtronics Pty Ltd. to develop an expressive, tiny, electronic Wicki-Hayden keyboard instrument: Thumtronics' "Thummer." The generic name for a Thummer-like instrument is "jammer". With two thumb-sticks and internal motion sensors, a jammer would afford 10 degrees of freedom, which would make it the most expressive polyphonic instrument available. Without the expressive potential of a jammer, musicians lack the expressive power needed to exploit dynamic tonality in real time, so dynamic tonality's new tonal frontiers remain largely unexplored.
