= Isomorphic keyboard =

Musical input device

An isomorphic keyboard is a musical input device consisting of a two-dimensional grid of note-controlling elements (such as buttons or keys) on which any given sequence and/or combination of musical intervals has the "same shape" on the keyboard wherever it occurs – within a key, across keys, across octaves, and across tunings.

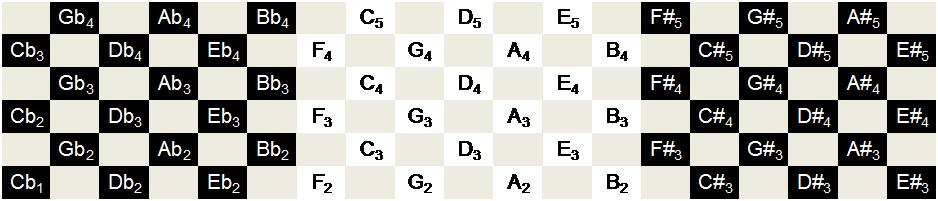
Fig. 1: The Wicki isomorphic keyboard note-layout, invented by Kaspar Wicki in 1896

== Examples ==
Helmholtz's 1863 book On the Sensations of Tone gave several possible layouts. Practical isomorphic keyboards were developed by Bosanquet (1875), Jankó (1882), Wicki (1896), Fokker (1951), Erv Wilson (1975–present), William Wesley (2001), and Antonio Fernández (2009). Accordions have been built since the 19th century using various isomorphic keyboards, typically with dimensions of semitones and tones. The keyboards of Bosanquet and Erv Wilson are also known as generalized keyboards. The keyboard of Antonio Fernández is also known as Transclado.

== Invariance ==
Isomorphic keyboards can expose, through their geometry, two invariant properties of music theory:

1. transpositional invariance, exposed in all isomorphic layouts by definition. Any given sequence and/or combination of musical intervals has the same shape when transposed to another key, and
2. tuning invariance, only exposed in certain layouts like Wicki and Bosanquet. Any given sequence and/or combination of musical intervals has the same shape when played in another tuning of the same musical temperament.

== Theory ==
All isomorphic keyboards derive their invariance from their relationship to rank-2 regular temperaments of just intonation. A two-dimensional lattice is generated by two basis vectors. A keyboard lattice generated by two given musical intervals, which are mapped to those basis vectors, is isomorphic with any rank-2 temperament that is also generated by those same two intervals. For example, an isomorphic keyboard generated by the octave and tempered perfect fifth will be isomorphic with both the syntonic and schismatic temperaments, which are both generated by those same two intervals.

== Benefits ==
Two primary benefits are claimed by the inventors and enthusiasts of isomorphic keyboards:

1. Ease of teaching, learning, and playing
  According to some authors, the invariance of isomorphic keyboards facilitates music education and performance. This claim has not been rigorously tested, so its validity has been neither proven nor disproven.
2. Microtonality
  Isomorphic keyboards' provision of more than the usual 12 note-controlling elements per octave may facilitate the performance of music that requires more than 12 notes per octave.

A third potential benefit of isomorphic keyboards, dynamic tonality, has recently been demonstrated, but its utility is not proven. Using a continuous controller, a performer can vary the tuning of all notes in real time, while retaining invariant fingering on an isomorphic keyboard. Dynamic tonality has the potential to enable new real-time tonal effects such as polyphonic tuning bends, new chord progressions, and temperament modulations, but the musical utility of these new effects has not been demonstrated.

== Comparisons ==
The Dodeka keyboard has its keys arranged along a single direction, while most other isomorphic keyboards have their keys arranged in two dimensions. On the Harmonic and Gerhard keyboards, the two smallest intervals between a key and its six adjacent keys are a minor third (3 semitones) and a major third (4 semitones). On the Wicki-Hayden and Array Mbira, the smallest intervals are a major second (2 semitones) and perfect fourth (5 semitones). On the Park keyboard, the smallest intervals are a major second (2 semitones) and a minor third (3 semitones). On the Jankó keyboard, the smallest intervals are an augmented unison (1 semitone) and a major second (2 semitones).

Isomorphic keyboards can be compared and contrasted using metrics such as the thickness of an octave's swathe of buttons on the keyboard and the number of repetitions of a given note on the keyboard. Different isomorphic keyboards are suited for different uses; for example, the Fokker keyboard is well-suited to tunings of the syntonic temperament in which the tempered perfect fifth stays in a narrow range around 700 cents, whereas the Wicki keyboard is useful over both this and a much broader range of tunings.

== See also ==
- Array mbira
- Chromatic button accordion
- Harpejji
- Wicki-Hayden note layout
- Dodeka keyboard
- Harmonic table note layout
- Jankó keyboard
