= Bosanquet (surname) =

Bosanquet is a surname. Notable people with the surname include:

- Bernard Bosanquet (philosopher) (1848–1923), English philosopher
- Bernard Bosanquet (cricketer) (1877–1936), English cricketer, credited with inventing the googly, a bowling technique
- Caroline Bosanquet (1940–2013), British cellist, music teacher and composer
- Charles Bosanquet (1769–1850), English official and writer
- Charles Ion Carr Bosanquet (1903–1986), first Vice-Chancellor of Newcastle University
- Admiral Sir Day Hort Bosanquet (1843–1923), 16th Governor of South Australia
- Sir Frederick Albert Bosanquet, KC, JP (1837–1923), Common Serjeant of London
- Helen Bosanquet (1860–1926), English social theorist and social reformer
- Jacob Bosanquet Jr. (1755–1828), High Sheriff of Hertfordshire and Chairman of the East India Company
- James Whatman Bosanquet (1804–1877), English banker and writer on biblical chronology
- Sir John Bosanquet KS PC (1773–1847), British judge
- Lancelot Stephen Bosanquet (1903–1984), English mathematician
- Sir Oswald Bosanquet (1866–1933), British administrator in India
- Nicholas Bosanquet (1942–2026), British health economist
- Reginald Bosanquet (1932–1984), British journalist and broadcaster
- Robert Carr Bosanquet (1871–1935), British archaeologist
- Robert Holford Macdowall Bosanquet (1841–1913), English scientist and music theorist
- Sir Ronald Courthope Bosanquet (1868–1952), English barrister and Official Referee of the Supreme Court
- Samuel Richard Bosanquet (1800–1882), English barrister and writer on legal, social and theological topics
- Theodora Bosanquet (1880–1961), British amanuensis and editor,
- William Cecil Bosanquet (1866–1941), English physician
