= Regular diatonic tuning =

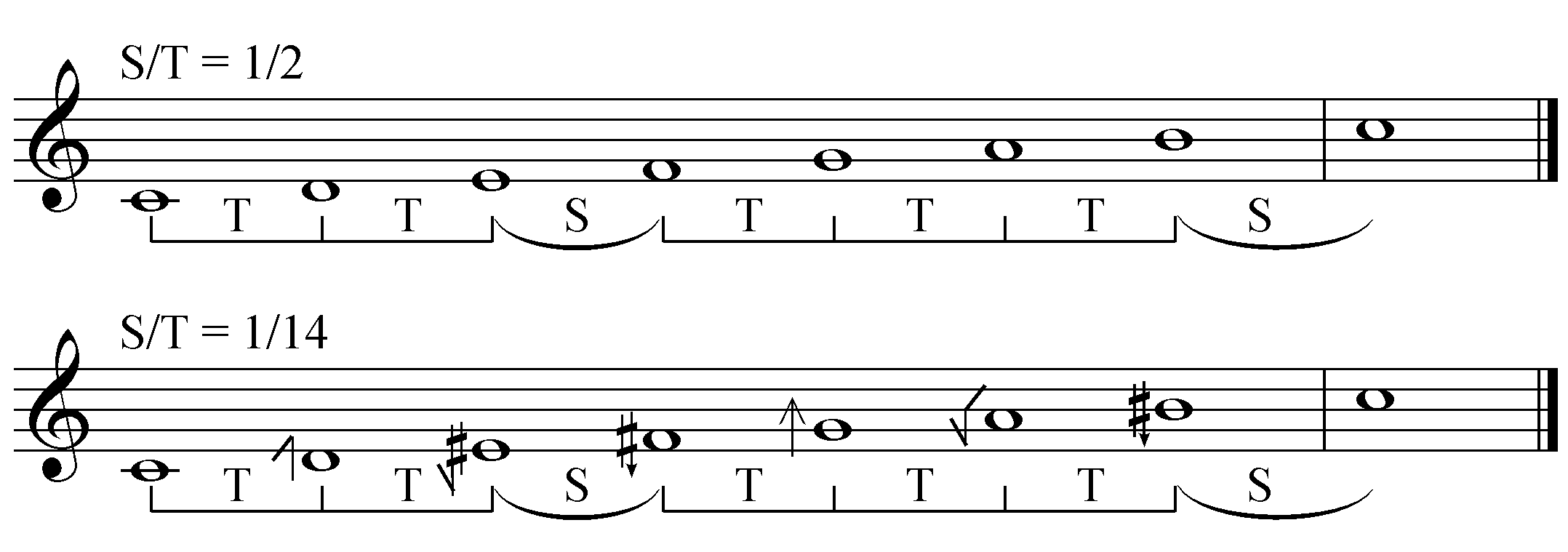
12-tone, 72-tone (Maneri-Sims notation), and also (both written the same as 12-tone in Easley Blackwood notation) 17-tone and 19-tone regular diatonic scales

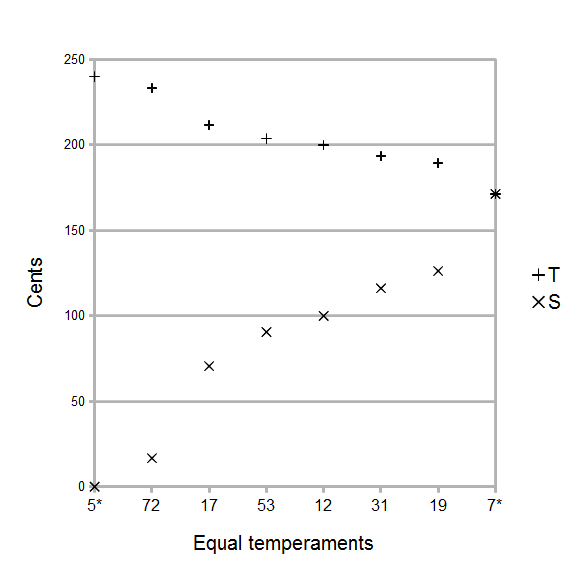
T and S in various equal temperaments (*5-tone and 7-tone are the limits of and not regular diatonic tunings) and

A regular diatonic tuning is any musical scale consisting of "tones" (T) and "semitones" (S) arranged in any rotation of the sequence TTSTTTS which adds up to the octave with all the T's being the same size and all the S's the being the same size, with the 'S's being smaller than the 'T's. In such a tuning, then the notes are connected together in a chain of seven fifths, all the same size (TTTS or a permutation of that) which makes it a Linear temperament with the tempered fifth as a generator.

== Overview ==
For the ordinary diatonic scales described here, the T-s are tones and the s-s are semitones which are half, or approximately half the size of the tone. But in the more general regular diatonic tunings, the two steps can be of any relation within the range between T = 171.43 ¢ (for s = T at the high extreme) and T = 240 ¢ (for s = 0 at the low extreme) in musical cents (fifth, p5, between 685.71 ¢ and 720 ¢). Note that regular diatonic tunings are not limited to the notes of any particular diatonic scale used to describe them.

One may determine the corresponding cents of s, T, and the fifth (p5), given one of the values:

semitone	$\ s = \tfrac{\ 1\ }{ 2 } \left(\ 1200\text{¢} - 5\ T\ \right)\$
full tone	$\ T = \tfrac{\ 1\ }{ 5 } \left(\ 1200\text{¢} - 2\ s\ \right)\$
perfect fifth	$\ \mathsf{p5} = \tfrac{\ 1\ }{ 2 } \left(\ T + 1200\text{¢} \right) = 3\ T + s\$

When the (diatonic) semitones, s, are reduced to zero (T = 240 ¢) the octave is T T T T T, or a five tone equal temperament. As the semitones get larger, eventually the steps are all the same size, and the result is in seven tone equal temperament (s = T = 171.43 ¢). These two extremes are not included as "regular" diatonic tunings, because to be "regular" the pattern of five large and two small steps has to be preserved; everything in between is regular, however small the semitones are without vanishing completely, or however large they become while still being strictly smaller than a whole tone.

"Regular" here is understood in the sense of a mapping from Pythagorean diatone such that all the interval relationships are preserved. For instance, in all regular diatonic tunings, just as for the Pythagorean diatonic:

- The notes are connected together through a chain of six fifths reduced to the octave, or equivalently, through ascending fifths and descending fourths (e.g. F C G D A E B in C major).
- A chain of three tones spaced in equal-sized fifths (reduced to the octave) generates a whole tone (e.g. C G D).
- A sequence of six tones spaced in fourths generates a semitone in the same way (e.g. E A D G C F).
- A sequence of five tones spaced in fifths (e.g. C G D A E) generates a major third, consisting of two whole tones.
- A chain of four tones spaced in fourths generates a minor third (A D G C)

and so on; in all those examples the result is "reduced to the octave" (lowered by an octave whenever a note in the sequence exceeds an octave above the starting tone).

If one breaks the rule for "regular" that s must be smaller than T and continues to increase the size of s further, so that it becomes larger than the T, one gets irregular scales with two large steps and five small steps (mavila temperament is a good example), and eventually, when all the T-s vanish the result is s s, so a division of the octave into tritones. However, these strange scales are only mentioned here to dismiss them; they not regular diatonic tunings.

All regular diatonic tunings are also linear temperaments, i.e. regular temperaments with two generators: the octave and the tempered fifth. One can use the tempered fourth as an alternative generator (e.g. as B E A D G C F, ascending fourths, reduced to the octave), but the tempered fifth is the more usual choice, and in any case, because fifths and fourths are octave complements, rising by perfect fourths produces the same result as rising by fifths.

All regular diatonic tunings are also generated collections (also called moments of symmetry) and the chain of fifths can be continued in either direction to obtain a twelve tone system F C G D A E B F^{♯} C^{♯} G^{♯} D^{♯} A^{♯}, where the interval F^{♯}-G is the same as B^{♭}-B, etc., another moment of symmetry with two interval sizes.

Instead of there being one semitone, s, there are actually two: the chromatic semitone, c, and the diatonic semitone, d; d is another name for s. Three notes spaced by a chromatic and diatonic semitone make a whole tone between the first and the last: c d = d c =T. The small difference in pitch between the two is called a comma, usually prefixed by the name of the tuning system that generates it, such as a syntonic comma (21.5 ¢), or Pythagorean comma (23.5 ¢), or a 53 tet comma (22.6 ¢).

A chain of eight notes spaced in fifths generates a chromatic semitone, c, as the space between the first and the last; it is the change of pitch needed to raise a minor tone to a major tone; for instance from E^{♭} to E. For any tuning, the chromatic semitone is the space between a flat note and its natural, or a natural note and its sharp; between a white key and either the black key above it (if tuned as a sharp) or the black key below it (if tuned as a flat); in most tunings, the two intervals are different. The diatonic semitone, d, called s above, is the change in pitch of a sequence of six notes spaced by fifths, e.g. from E to F or B to C. For any tuning, the diatonic semitone is the relative pitch difference on a standard keyboard between two white keys that have no black key between them. The pattern of chromatic and diatonic semitones is c d c d d c d c d c d d or some mixed-around version of it. Here, the seven equal system is the limit as the chromatic semitone tends to zero, and the five tone system in the limit as the diatonic semitone tends to zero.

== Range of recognizability ==
The regular diatonic tunings include all linear temperaments within Easley Blackwood's "Range of Recognizability" in his The Structure of Recognizable Diatonic Tunings for diatonic tunings with

- the fifth tempered to between 4/7 and 3/5 of an octave;
- the major and minor seconds both positive;
- the major second larger than the minor second.

However, his "range of recognizability" is more restrictive than "regular diatonic tuning". For instance, he requires the diatonic semitone to be at least 25 cents in size. See for a summary.

== Significant regions within the range ==
When the fifths are slightly flatter than in just intonation, then we are in the region of the historical meantone tunings, which distribute or temper out the syntonic comma. They include:

- 12 tone equal temperament, practically indistinguishable from 1/11 comma meantone
- 19 tone equal temperament – equivalent to 1 / 3 comma meantone; almost exactly achieves pure 6 / 5 minor thirds
- 31 tone equal temperament – equivalent to 1 / 4 comma meantone; achieves major thirds extremely close to 5 / 4 (387.1 cents); fifth is 696.77 cents; augmented 6th is within 1 cent of 7 / 4 (harmonic seventh)
- 43 tone equal temperament – equivalent to 1 / 5 comma meantone – achieves pure major sevenths of almost exactly 15/8; fifth is 697.67 cents
- 55 tone equal temperament – equivalent to 1 / 6 comma meantone – achieves a rational diatonic tritone 45 / 32 ; fifth is 698.18 cents

When the fifths are exactly 3 / 2 , or around 702 cents, the result is the Pythagorean diatonic tuning.

For fifths slightly narrower than 3 / 2 , the result is a schismatic temperament, where the temperament is measured in terms of a fraction of a schisma - the amount by which a chain of eight fifths reduced to an octave is sharper than the just minor sixth 8 / 5 . So for instance, a 1 / 8 schisma temperament will achieve a pure 8 / 5 in an ascending chain of eight fifths. 53 tone equal temperament achieves a good approximation to schismatic temperament.

If the fifth is tuned slightly sharp of just, between 702.4 and 705.9 cents, the result is very sharp major thirds with ratios near 14/ 11 (417.508 cents) and very flat minor thirds around 13/ 11 (289.210 cents). These tunings are known as "parapythagorean" tunings.

At 705.882 cents, with fifths tempered in the wide direction by 3.929 cents, the result is the diatonic scale in 17 tone equal temperament. Beyond this point, the regular major and minor thirds approximate simple ratios of numbers with prime factors 2-3-7, such as the 9 / 7 or septimal major third (435.084 cents) and 7 / 6 or septimal minor third (266.871 cents). At the same time, the regular tones more and more closely approximate a large 8/7 tone (231.174 cents), and regular minor sevenths the "harmonic seventh" at the simple ratio of 7 / 4 (968.826 cents). This septimal range, known as "superpythagorean", extends out to around 711.11 cents or 27 tone equal temperament, or a bit further.

That leaves the two extremes:

- The "inframeantone" range is the flatmost extreme, where the fifth is between the lower bound for the regular diatonic of 7 tone equal temperament (685.71 cents) and the range of historical meantones beginning around 19 tone equal temperament (694.74 cents). Here, the diatonic semitones approach the size of the whole tone. Microtonal music theorists have further subdivided this into 3 smaller ranges:
  - The range between 685.71 cents and 690.91 cents (the fifth of 33 tone equal temperament, which represents 1 / 2 comma meantone) is the range of the "deeptone" temperament. In this range, the notational "major third" is a neutral third (representing the tridecimal neutral third 16/13) due to equalization in the direction of 7 tone equal temperament, while the notational "augmented third" approximates the classical major third 5/4.
  - The range between 690.91 cents and 692.31 cents (the fifth of 26 tone equal temperament) is the range of the "flattertone" temperament, which is still considered a meantone temperament, in that the notational "major third" represents 5/4 (albeit tuned particularly flat), but it has a mapping of 7-limit intervals differing from septimal meantone temperament, finding the harmonic seventh as the double-augmented sixth, whereas septimal meantone finds it at the augmented sixth.
  - The range between 692.31 cents and 694.74 cents (19 tone equal temperament) is the range of the "flattone" temperament, which is still considered a meantone temperament, in that the notational "major third" represents 5/4 (albeit tuned particularly flat), but it has a mapping of 7-limit intervals differing from septimal meantone temperament, finding the harmonic seventh as the diminshed seventh, whereas septimal meantone finds it at the augmented sixth.
- The "ultraseptimal" or "ultrapythagorean" range encompasses the sharpmost extreme, between 711.11 cents as seen in 27 tone equal temperament all the way to the upper bound of the regular diatonic at 720 cents or 5 tone equal temperament. As one tends towards 5 equal, the diatonic semitones become smaller and smaller.

Diatonic scales constructed in equal temperaments can have fifths either wider or narrower than a just 3 / 2 . Here are a few examples:

- 15, 17, 22, and 27 have fifths wider than a just 3 / 2
- 12 (and its multiples), 19, 31, and 43 have fifths narrower than a just 3 / 2

== Syntonic temperament and timbre ==
The term syntonic temperament describes the combination of

1. the continuum of tunings in which the tempered perfect fifth (P5) is the generator and the octave is the period;
2. Comma sequences that start with the syntonic comma (i.e., in which the syntonic comma is tempered to zero, making the generated major third as wide as two generated major seconds); and
3. the "tuning range" of P5 temperings in which the generated minor second is neither larger than the generated major second, nor smaller than the unison.

This combination is necessary and sufficient to define a set of relationships among tonal intervals that is invariant across the syntonic temperament's tuning range. Hence, it also defines an invariant mapping -- all across the tuning continuum -- between (a) the notes at these (pseudo-Just) generated tonal intervals, and (b) the corresponding partials of a similarly-generated pseudo-Harmonic timbre. Hence, the relationship between the syntonic temperament and its note-aligned timbres can be seen as a generalization of the special relationship between Just Intonation and the Harmonic Series.

Maintaining an invariant mapping between notes and partials, across the entire tuning range, enables Dynamic tonality, a novel expansion of the framework of tonality, which includes timbre effects such as primeness, conicality, and richness, and tonal effects such as polyphonic tuning bends and dynamic tuning progressions.

If one considers the syntonic temperament's tuning continuum as a string, and individual tunings as beads on that string, then one can view much of the traditional microtonal literature as being focused on the differences among the beads, whereas the syntonic temperament can be viewed as being focused on the commonality along the string.

Figure 1: The syntonic temperament's tuning continuum, from (Milne et al. 2007)

The notes of the syntonic temperament are best played using the Wicki-Hayden note layout. Because the syntonic temperament and the Wicki-Hayden note-layout are generated using the same generator and period, they are isomorphic with each other; hence, the Wicki-Hayden note-layout is an isomorphic keyboard for the syntonic temperament. The fingering-pattern of any given musical structure is the same in any tuning on the syntonic temperament's tuning continuum. The combination of an isomorphic keyboard and continuously variable tuning supports Dynamic tonality as described above.

As shown in the figure at right, the tonally valid tuning range of the syntonic temperament includes a number of historically important tunings, such as the currently popular 12-tone equal division of the octave (12-edo tuning, also known as 12-tone "equal temperament"), the meantone tunings, and Pythagorean tuning. Tunings in the syntonic temperament can be equal (12-edo, 31-edo), non-equal (Pythagorean, meantone), circulating, and Just.

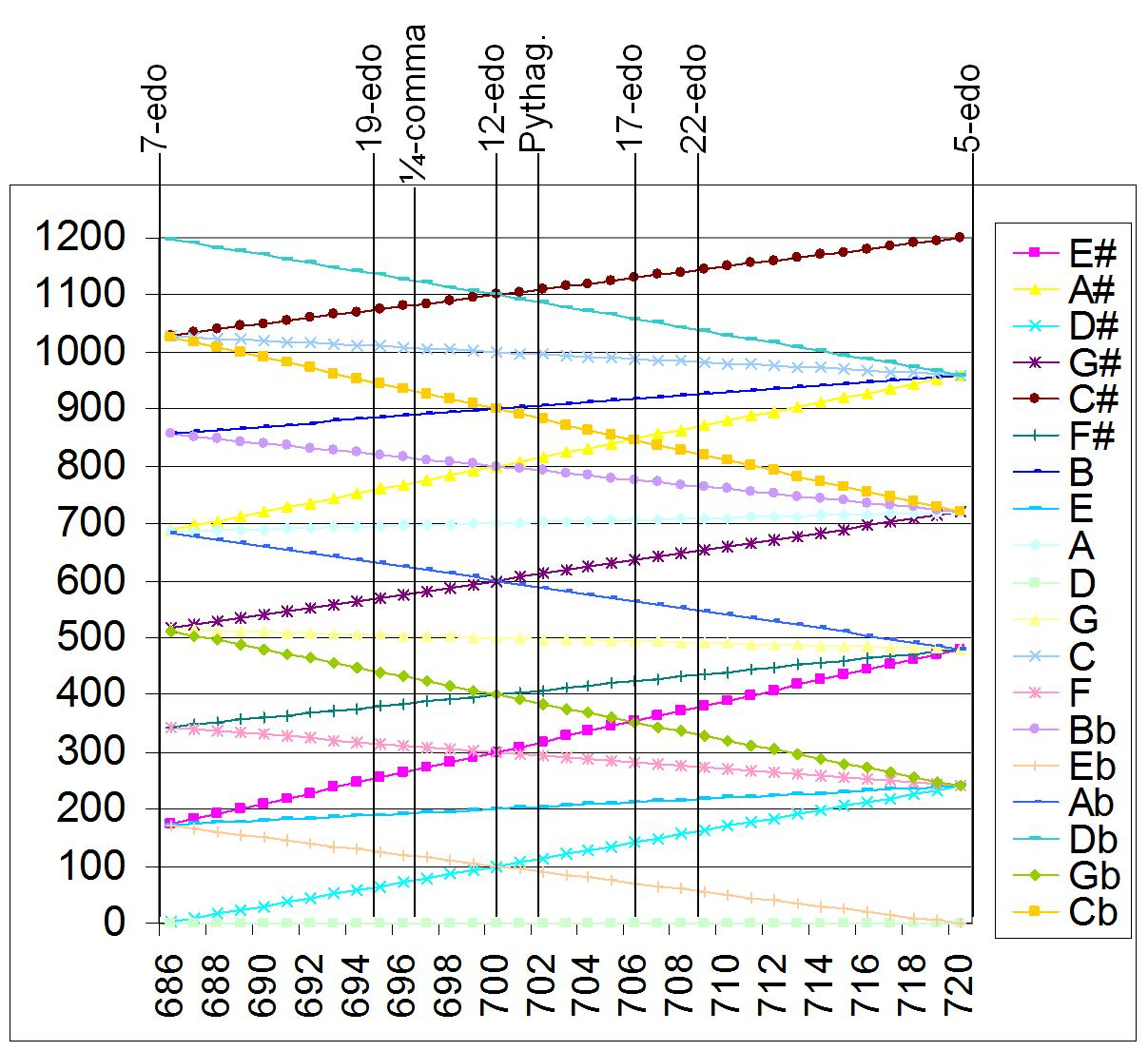
Figure 2: Change in widths of intervals of the syntonic temperament across its tuning continuum (tonic is D)

The legend of Figure 2 (on the right side of the figure) shows a stack of P5s centered on D. Each resulting note represents an interval in the syntonic temperament with D as the tonic. The body of the figure shows how the widths (from D) of these intervals change as the width of the P5 is changed across the syntonic temperament's tuning continuum.

- At P5 ≈ 685.7 cents, the intervals converge on just 7 widths (assuming octave equivalence of 0 and 1200 cents), producing 7-edo. S/T = 0.
- At P5 ≈ 694.7 (19-edo), the gaps between these 19 intervals are all equal, producing 19-edo tuning. S/T = 2/3.
- At P5 ≈ 696.8 (31-edo), a stack of 31 such intervals would show equal gaps between each such interval, producing 31-edo tuning. S/T = 3/5.
- At P5 = 700.0 (12-edo), the sharp notes and flat notes are equal, producing 12-edo tuning. S/T = 1/2.
- At P5 ≈ 701.9 (53-edo), a stack of 53 such intervals - each just 3/44 of a cent short of a pure fifth - makes 31 octaves, producing 53-edo tuning. S/T = 4/9.
- etc....
- at P5 = 720.0 cents, the pitches converge on just 5 widths, producing 5-edo. S/T = 1.

== Research projects regarding the syntonic temperament ==
- The research program Musica Facta investigates the musical theory of the syntonic temperament.
- The music theory of the Guido 2.0 research project is based on the syntonic temperament. Guido 2.0 seeks to achieve a 10x increase in the efficiency of music education by exposing the invariant properties of music's syntonic temperament (octave invariance, transpositional invariance, tuning invariance, and fingering invariance) with geometric invariance. Guido 2.0 is the Music Education aspect of Musica Facta (above).
