= Bosanquet =

Bosanquet may refer to:

- Bosanquet (surname)
- Bosanquet, Ontario, a former township in Canada
- County of Bosanquet, a cadastral unit in South Australia.
