= Array mbira =

Musical instrument

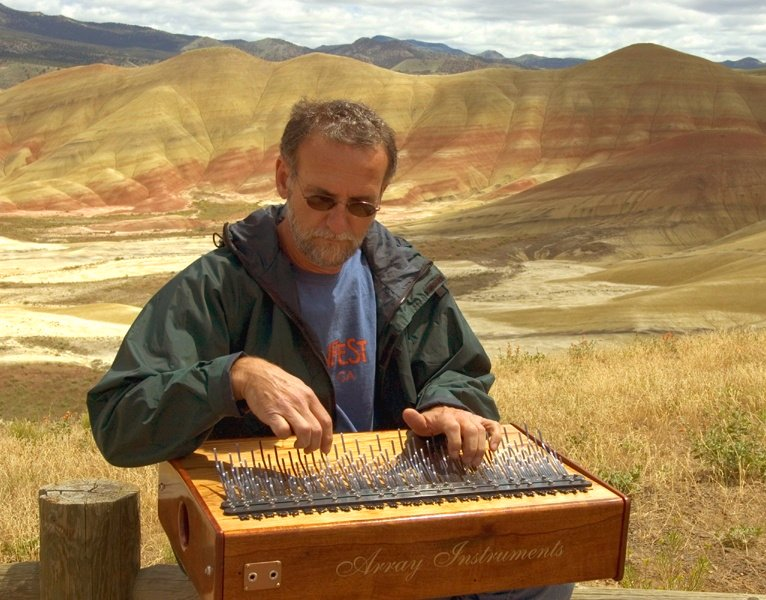
- Patrick Hadley playing an Array mbira

Other instrument
- Classification: Lamellophone, Plucked Idiophone
- Hornbostel–Sachs classification: 122.1 (Plucked idiophone)
- Timbre: clear, percussive, chimelike
- Volume: low
- Attack: fast
- Decay: moderate

Playing range
- two and a half repetitions of the entire chromatic scale

Related instruments
- mbira

The Array mbira /əmˈbɪərə/ is a handcrafted modern musical instrument with a unique harp- or bell-like sound. It is made in the United States by its inventor Bill Wesley and manufactured by Wesley with Patrick Hadley in San Diego, California, United States. Its development began in the 1960s. It is a radical redesign of the Shona African mbira from Zimbabwe and is part of the lamellaphone family.

The metal tines are grouped into multiple octaves. Sounding each grouping of octaves in a left-to-right direction runs through the circle of fifths, and sounding each group in a right-to-left direction runs through the circle of fourths (unlike a piano which runs through the chromatic scale). Usually, the Array mbira contains two and a half repetitions of the entire chromatic scale, arranged in a continuous circle of fifths. The octaves of each note (A220, A440, and A880, for example) are grouped together in a staggered, nearly vertical arrangement. Each of the metal tines in a group may be played independently, and multiple octaves may be sounded together in a one-fingered stroke. The octave groups may contain as few as two octaves (two tines), or as many as five. There are 12×2.5=30 octave groups in the standard design, so a five-octave Array mbira uses 5×30=150 tines. The arrangement of the tines allows music to be played with relative ease in any key. Some models have as many as 7 octaves so 7*30=210 tines.

== Description ==
Generally, the Array mbira is large enough to allow two people to play on the same instrument at once, side by side. It is a sturdy instrument, requiring only occasional care. Sounds are made by manually pushing down gently and releasing bent metal tines with a grasping fist movement of the fingers. Some contact with the finger nail helps to produce a crisp and clear tone. Low notes are played upwards with the pad of the thumb. The tines are made from high-carbon spring steel. They are individually hand-cut and ground to a smooth round shape on the ends. These tines are held down to the sounding board by two bolted crossbars. These crossbars keep the notes in tune over long periods, often many years. The names of the notes are engraved into the metal crossbar. The lower notes are closer to the player, and the higher notes are farther away. The tines are arranged so that the most consonant intervals (octaves, fifths, and fourths) vibrate along with the fundamental. Furthermore, each tine is bent at a certain angle to produce harmonics (most notably the 6th harmonic, or two octaves plus a fifth) that are more consonant than other mbiras and kalimbas.

Two types of Array mbiras are available: a hollow body and a solid body. Both models have dual piezoelectric pickups that produce two separate channels, one for the left side of the instrument and one for the right side. The hollow body is an acoustic instrument that utilizes a sound box, which can be made from a variety of domestic and exotic hardwoods. Because these instruments are handcrafted works of art, there are many options for embellishment, including various inlaid borders, burl veneers, colored lacquer and type of finish. The solid body instruments are heavier than the hollow bodies but smaller in overall size. They are better for live performances because they do not have problems with audio feedback when amplified.

== Arrangement ==
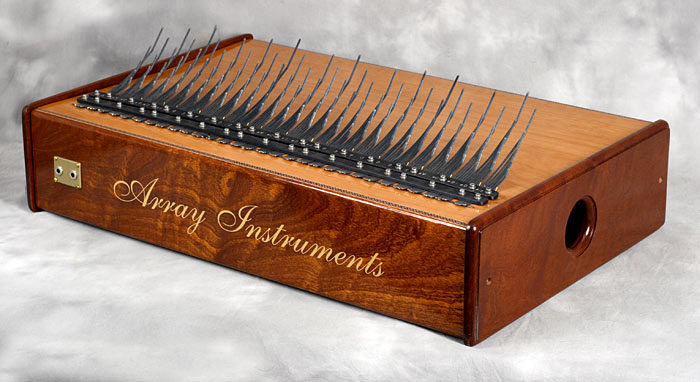
An array mbira covering 5 octaves

The notes (of which there may be up to 150, comprising up to five octaves) are arranged according to the Array system, developed by musicologist, performer, and author Bill Wesley. The Array system of organizing the notes is similar to the Wicki-Hayden note layout, while offering the advantage of being able to play multiple octaves of the same note with one finger.

The Array system is a specific pattern of arranging musical tones. It is both isomorphic and unimorphic (meaning that harmonious notes are grouped adjacently, excluding dissonant notes). There is only one unimorphic planar (as opposed to linear) system available on a lead instrument at this time, and that is the system used for organizing the Array mbira.

Because the Array system is isomorphic, any given chord, scale, or song, no matter how complex, can be played in any one of the 12 keys immediately after the player learns to play it in one key. Because it is unimorphic, common chords tend to fall close together. In the key of C, for example, the F and G major chords can be played by moving the C major chord shape one octave group to the left or right. The same applies to Em, Am, and Dm. The minor chord shape is easier to play with the left hand, while major chords are easier to play with the right hand.

There is a row for every possible musical interval, not just fifths, fourths, and octaves but also whole tones, minor thirds, etc. The Array system can be thought of not only as being based on the circle of fifths, but as being based on rows of whole tones. Each whole-tone row is separated by a fifth/fourth.

== Technique ==
The experience of playing an Array mbira is that less shifting around of movement is required for playing a given chord progression. Because of the duplications of all notes available (two to three times for every octave of every note), complex rhythms and fast melodies are easier to play. The Array system allows the player to access the same notes with each hand in different locations. In addition to this, the close grouping of octaves allows large chords to be played that would require four hands on a piano. An mbira with only two or three octaves is better suited to fast, complex melodies while the larger five octave model is better suited to large chords and complex voicings.

The shorter tines sound higher in pitch. This means that any ascending scale travels away from the player toward the back of the instrument. An ascending major scale is played by playing a "three-four" pattern: do-re-mi, fa-sol-la-ti, do-re-mi, etc., going higher and higher until you run out of notes. The visual/tactile sensation of playing a group of three notes followed by a group of four notes results from the nature of the major scale: two whole steps, followed by a half step, followed by three more whole steps, and ending with one more half step to get back to "do". The minor scale and the five other musical modes work much the same way, as does the major pentatonic scale and its "modes".

One possible playing position places both hands over the notes F, C, G, D, A, E, and B, the notes of the C major and A minor scales as well as many other scales and modes. Accidentals (F#, C#, G#, D#, A#) fall immediately between and outside of the hands. This position emphasizes consonant intervals. Moving the hands further apart or closer together yields positions that emphasize dissonant intervals.

== Cultural influence ==
The Array mbira is played by a number of notable musicians, including Sting, Ry Cooder, Emil Richards, Pharoah Sanders, Zakir Hussain, Greg Kurstin, Mileece, Shannon Terry, and Imogen Heap.

Array mbiras are also being used by a variety of TV and film composers. The Array mbira has been used on popular American TV shows such as Breaking Bad and True Blood as well as the Danish Academy Award winning film In a Better World.
