= Secor =

Secor may refer to:

== Places ==
=== United States ===
- Secor, Illinois, village
- Secor, Iowa, ghost town

== People ==
- T. F. Secor (1808–1901), American marine engineer
- Martin Mathias Secor (1841–1911), American businessman and politician
- Lella Secor Florence (1887–1966), American writer and activist
- George Secor (1943–2020), American musical theorist
  - The eponymous secor (interval)
- Kyle Secor (born 1957), American actor
- Ketch Secor (fl. 21st cen.), American musician of Old Crow Medicine Show

== See also ==
- SECOR (Sequential Collation of Ranges), a series of small geodetic United States Armed Forces satellites launched in the 1960s
- SECORE (marine conservation organization)
