= William Sethares =

American music theorist and engineer

William A. Sethares
- Born: April 19, 1955 (age 71); Massachusetts, U.S.
- Education: Cornell University
- Known for: Consonance
- Scientific career
- Fields: Signal processing and music theory
- Workplaces: University of Wisconsin–Madison
- Doctoral advisor: Yao Leeh-ter

William A. Sethares (born April 19, 1955) is an American professor of electrical engineering and music theorist at the University of Wisconsin. In music, he has contributed to the theory of dynamic tonality and provided a formalization of consonance.

== Consonance and dissonance ==
In the 1980s, Sethares began exploring microtonality. In 1990, he realized traditional definitions of consonance and dissonance can be reoriented when the harmonics of an interval are expanded, such as an octave that is slightly larger than its normal 2:1 ratio. Three years later, he wrote a paper about the relationship between tuning systems, timbre, and sensory consonance. Sethares also wrote a BASIC program to calculate dissonance curves, which measure the dissonance of any given interval in a scale. He felt the work demonstrated the possibility of synthesizing non-harmonic instruments that could play consonant music.

Sethares developed his ideas into the book Tuning, Timbre, Spectrum, Scale (1998), which explores the close relationship between timbre and tuning. When discussing Thai and Indonesian tuning systems, Sethares further explores how sensory consonance is compatible with microtonality. He frequently refers to Wendy Carlos' work and cites her demonstration that the consonance of any given interval is dependent on the timbre of its instrument.

A profile of Sethares' work enthused, "Physics had built a prison round music, and Sethares set it free." A blogger raved, "Tuning, Timbre, Spectrum, Scale is not only the most important book about tuning written to date, but it is the most important book about music theory written in human history."

Computer Music Journal published a more tempered response, "One might be seduced into thinking that this work presents part of a new grand theory of music, as a reviewer on amazon.com claims...This book/CD-ROM is a substantial continuing contribution to the future of digital music, presented with a passion rarely encountered in academic writing."

== See also ==
- Dynamic tonality
- Isomorphic keyboard
- Syntonic temperament

== External resources ==
- Webpage of Professor William Sethares at the University of Wisconsin.

- "Listen...", Sethares' recordings.

- Musica Facta, a defunct blog related to Sethares' work.
