= Robert Bosanquet =

Robert Bosanquet may refer to:

- Robert Holford Macdowall Bosanquet (1841–1912), English scientist and music theorist
- Robert Carr Bosanquet (1871–1935), British archaeologist
