= Dodeka keyboard =

Isomorphic musical keyboard

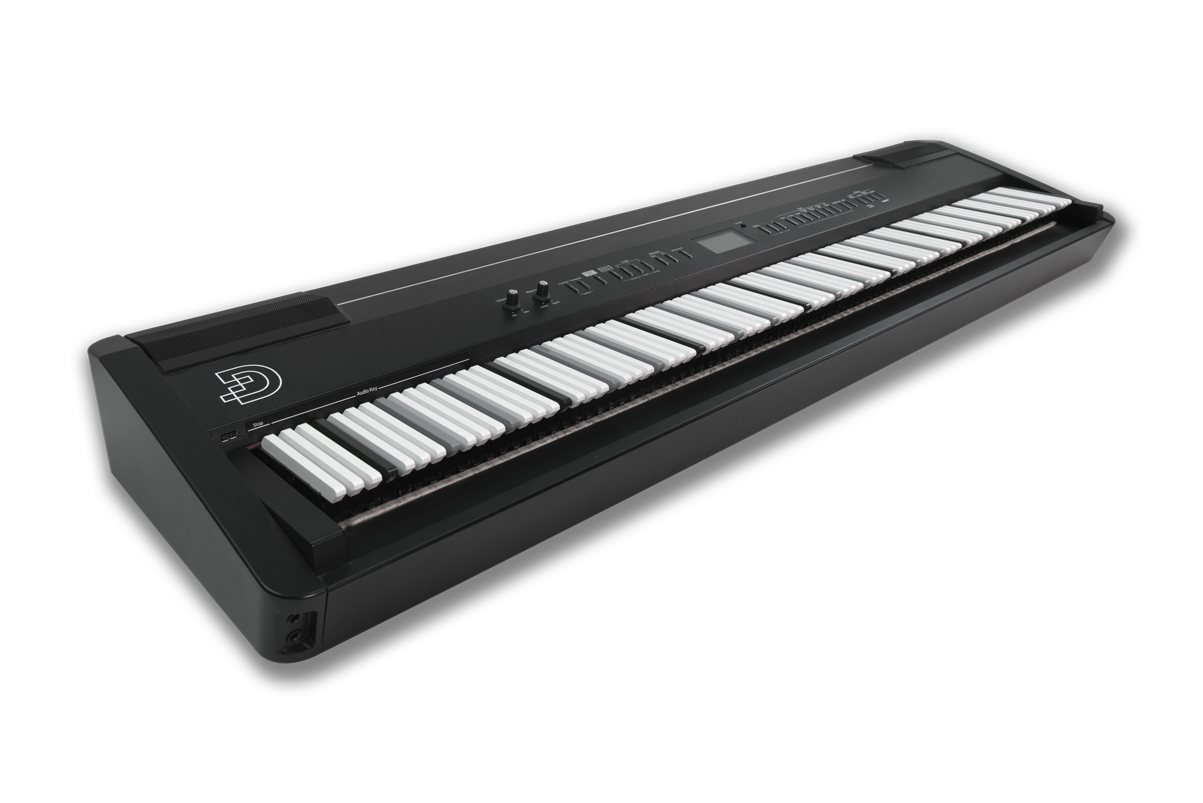

The Dodeka Keyboard design is an isomorphic keyboard invented and designed by Jacques-Daniel Rochat. It is similar to a piano keyboard but with only a single row of keys containing each chromatic note. The keys corresponding to C, E and A flat are highlighted to provide visual landmarks. The creators aimed to create a rational and chromatic approach to music and performance. As an isomorphic keyboard, any musical sequence or interval has the same shape in each of the 12 keys.

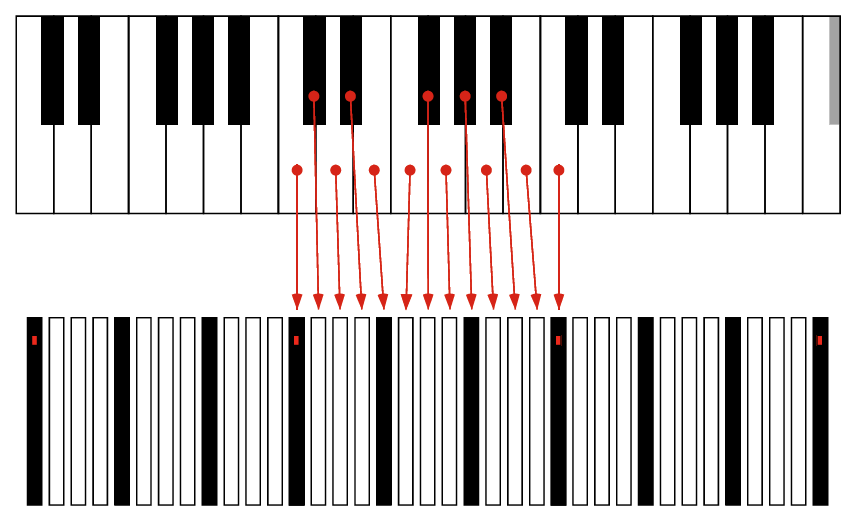
Comparison between Dodeka keyboard layout and traditional layout

== Music notation ==
The Dodeka design was developed together with the Dodeka Music Notation. It consists of a four-line chromatic staff, and represents rhythms only using the visual length of a bar on the staff, reminiscent of the appearance of "piano roll" in digital audio workstations.

== See also ==
- Isomorphic Keyboards
- Jankó keyboard
- Dodeka Music notation
