= 17 equal temperament =

Musical tuning system with 17 pitches equally-spaced on a logarithmic scale

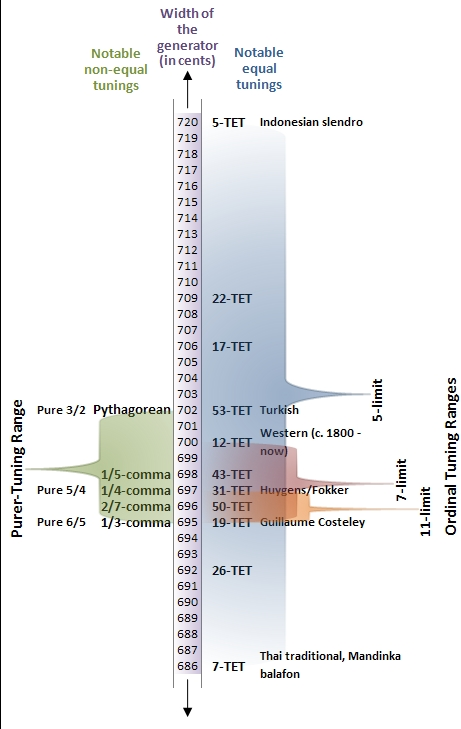
Figure 1: 17-ET on the regular diatonic tuning continuum at P5=705.88 cents.

1 step in 17-ET

In music, 17 equal temperament is the tempered scale derived by dividing the octave into 17 equal steps (equal frequency ratios). Each step represents a frequency ratio of $\sqrt[17]{2}$, or 70.6 cents.

17-ET is the tuning of the regular diatonic tuning in which the tempered perfect fifth is equal to 705.88 cents, as shown in Figure 1 (look for the label "17-TET").

== History and use ==
Alexander J. Ellis refers to a tuning of seventeen tones based on perfect fourths and fifths as the Arabic scale. In the thirteenth century, Middle-Eastern musician Safi al-Din Urmawi developed a theoretical system of seventeen tones to describe Arabic and Persian music, although the tones were not equally spaced. This 17-tone system remained the primary theoretical system until the development of the quarter tone scale.

== Notation ==
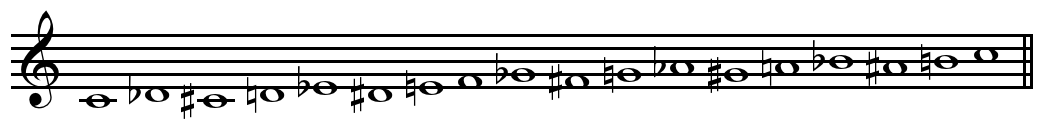
Notation of Easley Blackwood for 17 equal temperament: intervals are notated similarly to those they approximate and enharmonic equivalents are distinct from those of 12 equal temperament (e.g., A♯/C♭).

Easley Blackwood Jr. created a notation system where sharps and flats raised/lowered 2 steps, identical to ups and downs notation for 17-EDO. ((10*7) mod 17 = 2.) This yields the chromatic scale:

C, D♭, C♯, D, E♭, D♯, E, F, G♭, F♯, G, A♭, G♯, A, B♭, A♯, B, C

Quarter tone sharps and flats can also be used, yielding the following chromatic scale:

C, C/D♭, C♯/D, D, D/E♭, D♯/E, E, F, F/G♭, F♯/G, G, G/A♭, G♯/A, A, A/B♭, A♯/B, B, C

== Interval size ==
Below are some intervals in 17 EDO compared to just.

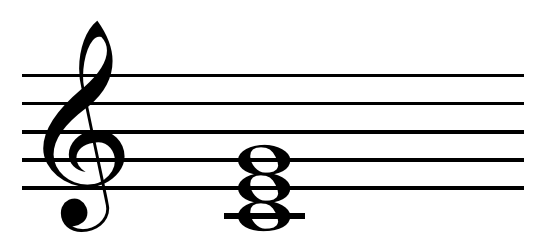
Major chord on C in 17 EDO : All notes are within 37 cents of just intonation (rather than 14 cents for 12 EDO).: 17 EDO; just; 12 EDO

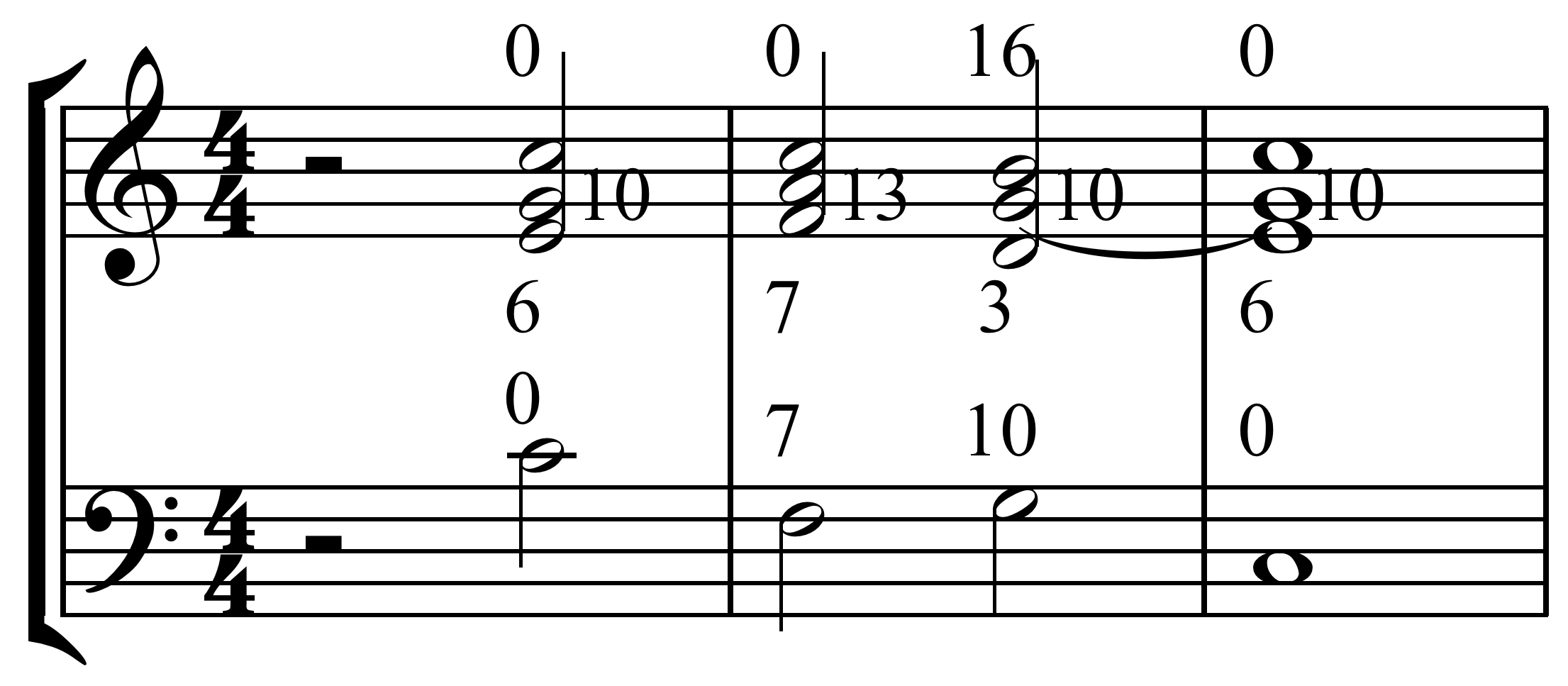
I–IV–V–I chord progression in 17 EDO. Whereas in 12 EDO, B♮ is 11 steps, in 17 EDO, B♮ is 16 steps.

| interval name | size (steps) | size (cents) | midi audio | just ratio | just (cents) | midi audio | error |
|---|---|---|---|---|---|---|---|
| octave | 17 | 1200 | | 2:1 | 1200 | | 0 |
| Major seventh | 16 | 1129.41 | | 27:14 | 1137.04 | | -7.62 |
| Major seventh | 16 | 1129.41 | | 15:8 | 1088.27 | | +41.14 |
| Neutral seventh | 15 | 1058.82 | | 11:6 | 1049.36 | | +9.46 |
| minor seventh | 14 | 988.23 | | 16:9 | 996.09 | | −7.77 |
| harmonic seventh | 14 | 988.23 | | 7:4 | 968.83 | | +19.41 |
| major sixth | 13 | 917.65 | | 27:16 | 905.87 | | +11.78 |
| neutral sixth | 12 | 847.06 | | 13:8 | 840.53 | | +6.53 |
| minor sixth | 11 | 776.47 | | 14:9 | 764.92 | | +11.55 |
| perfect fifth | 10 | 705.88 | | 3:2 | 701.96 | | +3.93 |
| augmented fourth (notational) | 9 | 635.29 | | 16:11 | 648.68 | | -13.39 |
| septimal tritone | 8 | 564.71 | | 7:5 | 582.51 | | −17.81 |
| tridecimal narrow tritone | 8 | 564.71 | | 18:13 | 563.38 | | +1.32 |
| undecimal super-fourth | 8 | 564.71 | | 11:8 | 551.32 | | +13.39 |
| perfect fourth | 7 | 494.12 | | 4:3 | 498.04 | | −3.93 |
| septimal major third | 6 | 423.53 | | 9:7 | 435.08 | | −11.55 |
| undecimal major third | 6 | 423.53 | | 14:11 | 417.51 | | +6.02 |
| major third | 5 | 352.94 | | 5:4 | 386.31 | | −33.37 |
| tridecimal neutral third | 5 | 352.94 | | 16:13 | 359.47 | | −6.53 |
| undecimal neutral third | 5 | 352.94 | | 11:9 | 347.41 | | +5.53 |
| minor third | 4 | 282.35 | | 6:5 | 315.64 | | −33.29 |
| tridecimal minor third | 4 | 282.35 | | 13:11 | 289.21 | | −6.86 |
| septimal minor third | 4 | 282.35 | | 7:6 | 266.87 | | +15.48 |
| septimal whole tone | 3 | 211.76 | | 8:7 | 231.17 | | −19.41 |
| greater whole tone | 3 | 211.76 | | 9:8 | 203.91 | | +7.85 |
| lesser whole tone | 3 | 211.76 | | 10:9 | 182.40 | | +29.36 |
| neutral second, lesser undecimal | 2 | 141.18 | | 12:11 | 150.64 | | −9.46 |
| greater tridecimal 2 / 3 -tone | 2 | 141.18 | | 13:12 | 138.57 | | +2.60 |
| lesser tridecimal 2 / 3 -tone | 2 | 141.18 | | 14:13 | 128.30 | | +12.88 |
| septimal diatonic semitone | 2 | 141.18 | | 15:14 | 119.44 | | +21.73 |
| diatonic semitone | 2 | 141.18 | | 16:15 | 111.73 | | +29.45 |
| septimal chromatic semitone | 1 | 70.59 | | 21:20 | 84.47 | | −13.88 |
| chromatic semitone | 1 | 70.59 | | 25:24 | 70.67 | | −0.08 |

=== Relation to 34 EDO ===
17 EDO is a subset of 34 EDO, equivalent to every other step in the 34 EDO scale.

== Sources ==
- Milne, Andrew; Sethares, William; Plamondon, James (Winter 2007). "Isomorphic controllers and dynamic tuning: Invariant fingering over a tuning continuum". Computer Music Journal. 31 (4): 15–32. doi:10.1162/comj.2007.31.4.15. S2CID 27906745 – via mitpressjournals.org.
