= Harmonetta =

Mouth-blown free-reed instrument

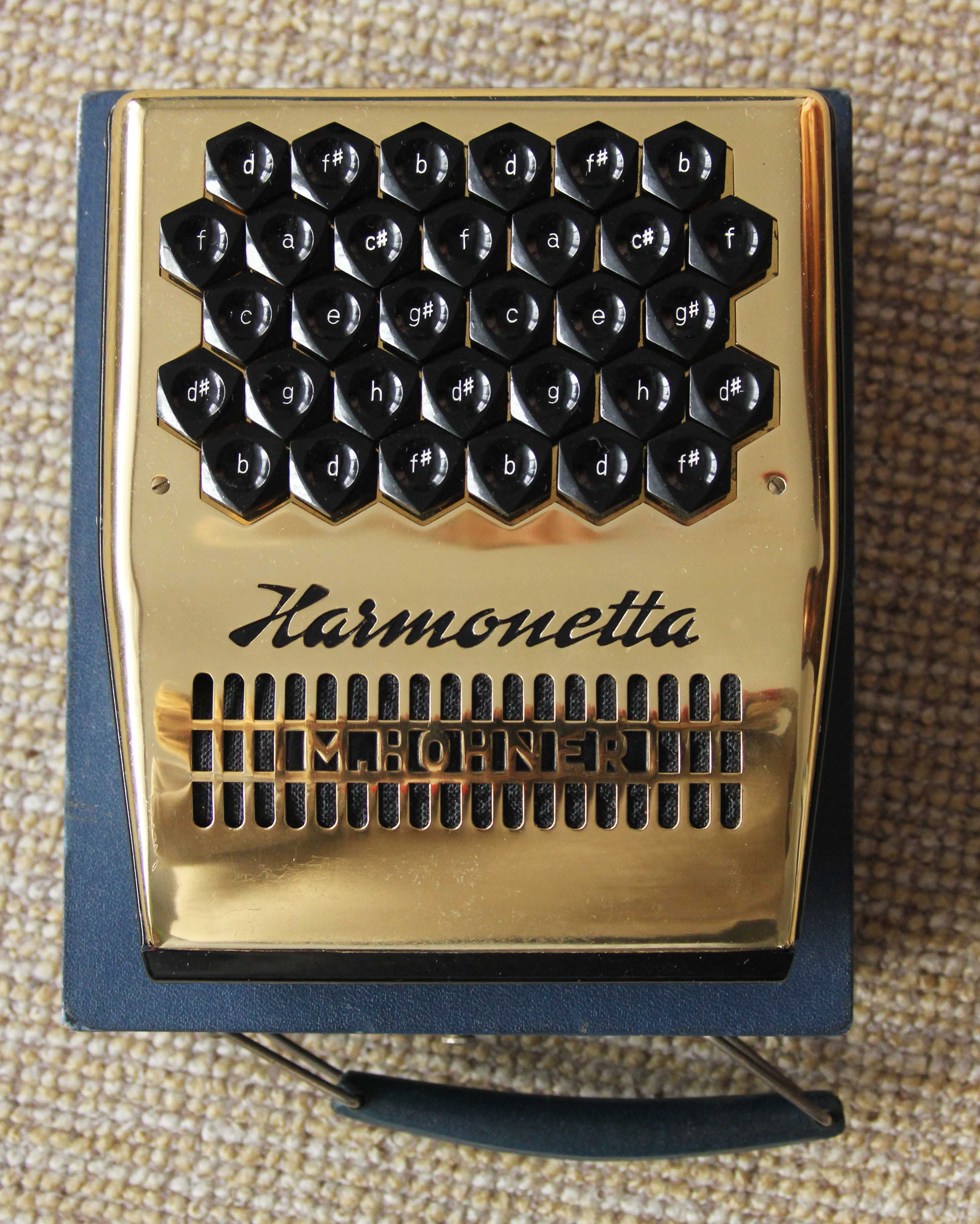
Hohner Harmonetta

Diagram of the Harmonetta keyboard (German note names.)

The Hohner Harmonetta is a mouth-blown free-reed instrument which was introduced by Hohner in the 1950s. It has an approximately 3-octave range, from C3 to B5.

The Harmonetta combines features of the harmonica and the melodica. It has a keyboard of 32 hexagonal buttons laid out according to the harmonic table, each labeled with one of the 12 pitch classes. The buttons (on this particular example) are labelled in German, thus the letter "h" is used where English speakers would use "b", and the letter "b" is used where an English speaker would use "Bb". Depressing a key makes it possible to play all notes of that pitch class; which octave sounds depends on where the mouth is positioned on the mouthpiece. There were other location-specific versions of the Harmonetta released, including the French-designated one, in which the buttons say tone names such as "Do Re Me" instead of "C D E". There was also the US export versions. The instrument is unisonoric, meaning that the same note is played on both blowing and drawing. Hohner discontinued the Harmonetta in 1984.

The earliest of the Harmonettas featured all black keys, and did not say "Made in Germany" on the cover plates. These Harmonettas internally used red Bakelite parts. The cases of these first Harmonettas were wooden, with felt interior. Starting on the 2nd generation models, the case was changed to a zipper and the "made in Germany" stamping appeared on the top cover. The later Harmonettas (1960s and newer) featured white rings around the "E" keys, in the center of the instrument and had black internal Bakelite parts.

There was a 2-row prototype Harmonetta, with a built-in synthesizer, called the CharlieMonica, built in the early 1970s. It is thought that Bernie Bray owned this instrument for a short time.

Common problems with the Harmonettas include failed (dried) windsavers, broken gaskets, glue failing to hold the windsavers on, sticky sliding counterparts, cracked/chipped mouthpieces, and the screws holding the brass shutters falling out. A good test for functionality of the shutters is to attempt to blow/draw into the Harmonetta without pressing any buttons. If the instrument produces noise, the brass shutters have failed or need to be adjusted.
