= Harmonic table note layout =

Key layout for musical instruments

Harmonic table note layout.

The Harmonic Table note-layout, or tonal array, is a key layout for musical instruments that offers interesting advantages over the traditional keyboard layout.

Its symmetrical, hexagonal pattern of interval sequences places the notes of the major and minor triads together. It is sometimes called the Melodic Table note-layout, and more rarely the Triad note-layout. It is related to the Wicki-Hayden based keyboards and other isomorphic keyboards, both of which can be utilized on the jammer keyboard musical interface.

== History ==
The structure and properties of the Harmonic Table have been well known since at least the 18th century. Indeed, as a pitch space, the Harmonic Table is topologically equivalent to Euler's Tonnetz, discovered by the Swiss mathematician Leonhard Euler in 1739. The two pitch arrays are trivially obtained from each other by direct shear mapping. This note layout created by Euler is utilised in Neo-Riemannian theory to geometrically model its musical ideas.

The Harmonic Table keyboard layout was used in a keyboard harmonica called the Harmonetta, invented by Ernst Zacharias and manufactured by Hohner from the early 1950s through the mid-1970s. A similar keyboard was developed by Larry Hanson in 1942 for use with a 53 tone scale but turns the fifth sideways and the major third to the right and up.

Keyboard note layout of the Harmonetta

The modern layout was proposed in 1983 by inventor Peter Davies, who obtained an international patent for its use in instruments in 1990. Davies coined the term Melodic Table to refer to the layout. It was afterwards renamed to Harmonic Table by the first major manufacturer, C-Thru Music and publicized by the company. This layout is used in the sonome family of keyboards, currently commercially manufactured as the Axis and Opal keyboards. Keyboards using this layout can also be emulated on tablet computers like the iPad, such as in the app Musix.

== Special features of the Harmonic table ==
There are a large number of isomorphic note-assignments possible; however, the Harmonic Table format is unusual in the musically important intervals it uses:

- Note-values ascend by the musical interval of a perfect fifth along the vertical axis.
- On one diagonal axis notes ascend by four semitones (a major third or diminished fourth).
- On the remaining diagonal axis notes ascend by three semitones (a minor third or augmented second).
- The notes of commonly played chords (except the octave) are clustered close together.
- Any major triad and minor triad, in root position, can be played with a single finger

Ergonomically, the harmonic table format is exceptionally compact: all notes of the major and minor scales fall under the fingers, and all common chords can be played with one or two fingers.

== Uses ==
This key layout has attracted the attention of numerous professional musicians, including Brian May and Jordan Rudess who find that it gives them a novel view of music, which is reportedly very useful in composing. It also works well with novel tunings such as the Bohlen–Pierce scale.

It is in use for ongoing research into microtonal scales by music researchers and composers, in particular Carlo Serafini, Elaine Walker and Dr. Richard Boulanger.

== See also ==
- Concertinas have a somewhat similar key arrangement
