= Magic temperament =

In microtonal music, magic temperament is a regular temperament whose period is an octave and whose generator is an approximation to the 5/4 just major third. In 12-tone equal temperament, three major thirds add up to an octave, since it tempers the interval 128/125 to a unison. In magic temperament, this comma is not tempered away, and the sequence of notes separated by major thirds continues indefinitely.

Instead of 128/125, 3125/3072 vanishes in magic temperament, where each 5/4 major third is made slightly narrow (about 380 cents), so that five of them add up to an approximate 3/1 (an octave plus a perfect fifth). A chain of these thirds can be used to generate a 7-tone scale with the following interval distribution (given in cents):

0 322 381 703 762 1084 1142 1201

Note that this represents only one possible tuning of magic temperament. The important property is that the major third is tempered slightly flatter than its just value of 386 cents, so that five of them less an octave yield a good approximation to the perfect fifth (702 cents).

If the sequence of major thirds is continued, the next moments of symmetry are at 10-, 13-, and 16-tone scales. Magic temperament is compatible with divisions of the octave into nineteen, twenty-two, and forty-one equal parts, which is to say that these equal temperaments make reasonable tunings for magic temperament, and therefore a piece written in magic temperament can be performed in any of them.
