= Wicki–Hayden note layout =

Compact musical keyboard layout

Notes of each major scale are stacked on top of each other (in alternating rows of three and four notes), putting them closer together.

The Wicki–Hayden note layout is a compact and logical musical keyboard layout designed for concertinas and bandoneons.

== History ==
The Wicki–Hayden (W/H) layout was initially conceived by Kaspar Wicki for the bandoneon and patented in 1896. It was independently conceived and refined by Brian Hayden, a concertina player, who patented it again a century later, in 1986. Since then concertinas have been built with this layout. Compared to the prior bandoneon and concertina layouts the notes are arranged in a much more logical way. It is an isomorphic note layout, which means that musical intervals always have the same shape, allowing the player to use the same patterns and fingering in different keys.

== Compared to the standard piano keyboard ==
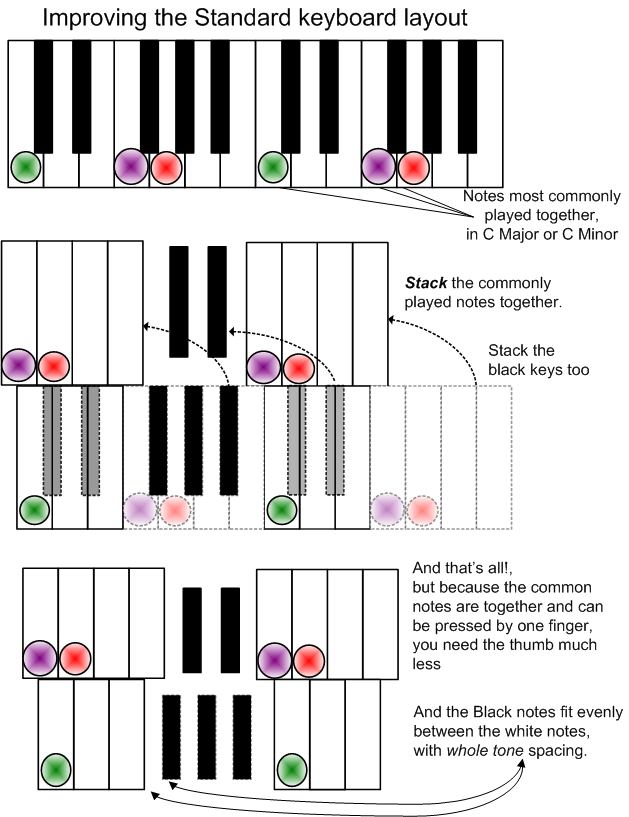
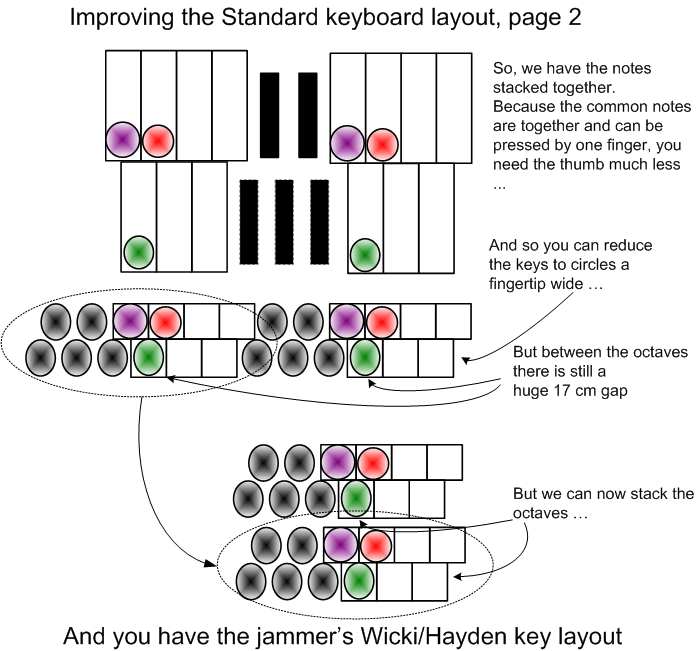
Relating the Piano layout to the Wicki–Hayden.

The piano keyboard has the seven notes of the diatonic scale on the white keys (CDEFGAB). These can be grouped into two groups with consistent whole note steps, the first 3 keys (CDE) and the following 4 keys (FGAB). The black keys can be similarly divided into two groups of 2 and 3 keys. The same groups can be found in the Wicki–Hayden layout, with benefits that a step to the right now always is a whole note, and that the notes within a key are closer together.

=== Advantages ===
In western music's preeminent major scale, the important notes are the white keys on a piano. However, their linear layout presents ergonomic challenges:

- Keys are far apart and therefore slow to play, as the hands have to move a considerable distance.
- The intervals between neighboring white keys are irregular: sometimes a whole step (C–D) and at others a half step (E–F).
- The combination of white and black keys and the pitch-to-key distance and vector is irregular.
- New players must watch the keyboard, instead of reading the score.
- The keys that sound worst when played together are right next to each other, increasing the chance of mistakes.
- Both hands have different fingerings. At the right hand the thumb shows to the lower tones, at the left hand it shows to the higher tones.

The W/H layout avoids these problems:

- Commonly played notes are grouped much closer together.
- The uniform isomorphic layout makes fingering patterns consistent, so only one fingering must be learned, instead of twelve for each hand (24 patterns in total) as on the piano.
- The normally troublesome black keys move out of the way and are split into two groups: a "sharp" and a "flat" section.
- Instead of mistakes sounding bad, they sound consonant, allowing for easy jamming.
- Because on concertinas and bandoneons both hands have separated button boards, instrument makers can build mirrored button boards, so that the left hand has the same fingering as the right hand. In this case the left hand can immediately play the same melody as the right hand.

To summarize, the Wicki/Hayden layout moves the keys to where they are more reachable, useful and less prone to mistakes.

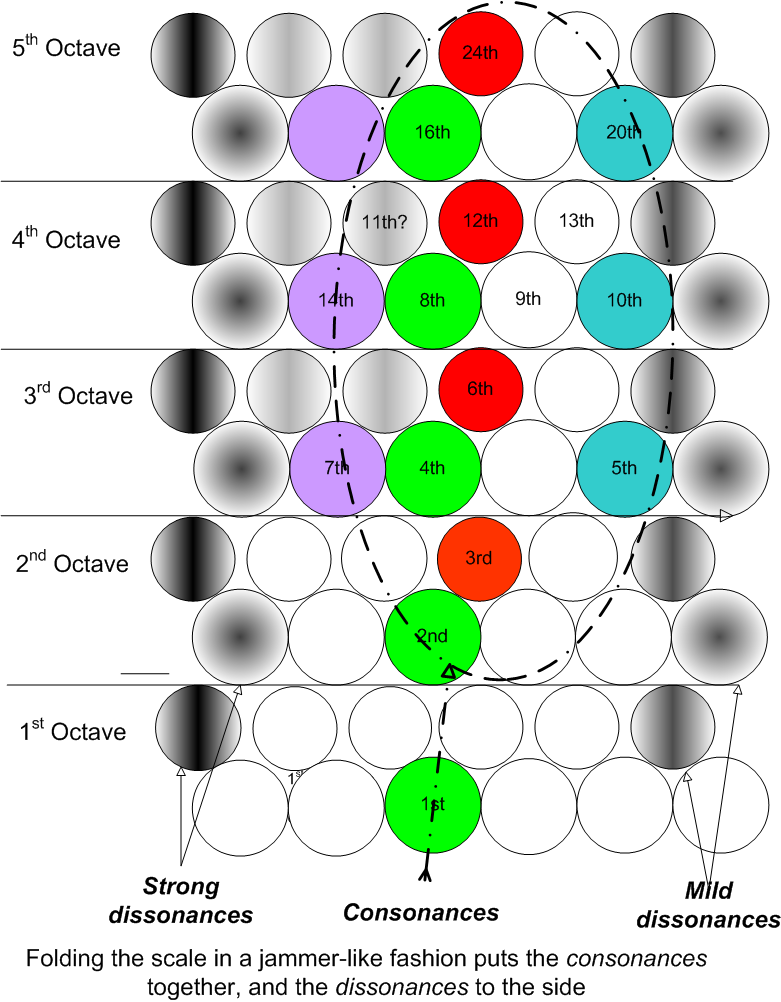
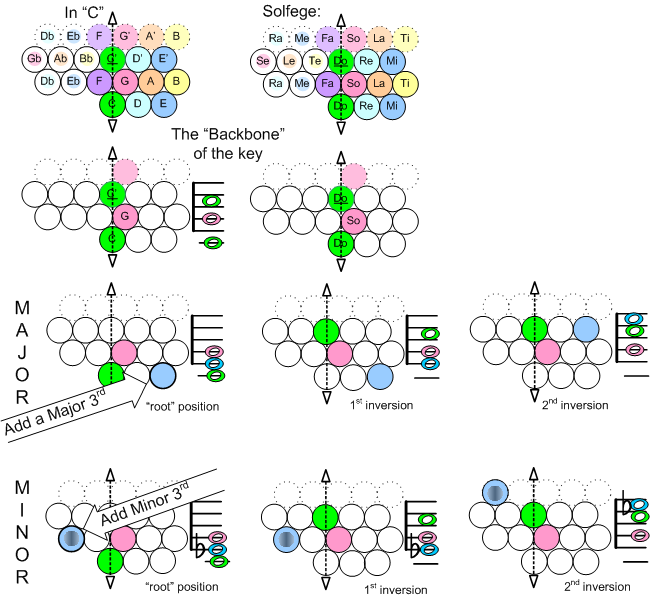
Left: An advanced diagram, showing what is impractical to show on a traditional keyboard: the dissonance areas around the harmonics.
Right: Some of the chords playable

Some studies and the consonance/dissonance diagram to the right indicate there may be strong parallels to the way the brain hears music.

=== Disadvantages ===
A proposed problem with the Wicki/Hayden system is that the keys are not in chromatic order. It is argued from this that playing impromptu ornamental flourishes and accidental passing tones is less intuitive than on chromatically ordered key arrangements. In the common practice of much modern western music, especially improvised music like jazz, almost every chromatic note is commonly used within any key signature. It initially was argued that the less-intuitive ergonomic access to chromatic intervals would prove to be a detriment to performing musical styles that make heavier use of dissonance. However, experimental players of the layout report the isomorphism provides a firmer framework to choose desired sounds and effects.

== Color schemes ==
These are some possible color schemes that can be used with the Wicki/Hayden layout:

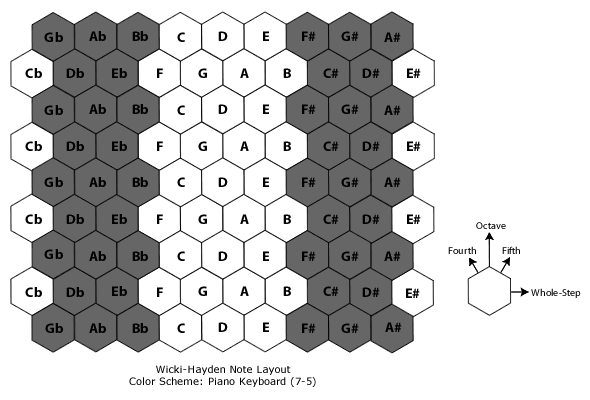
Traditional Piano Keyboard (7–5) Color Scheme

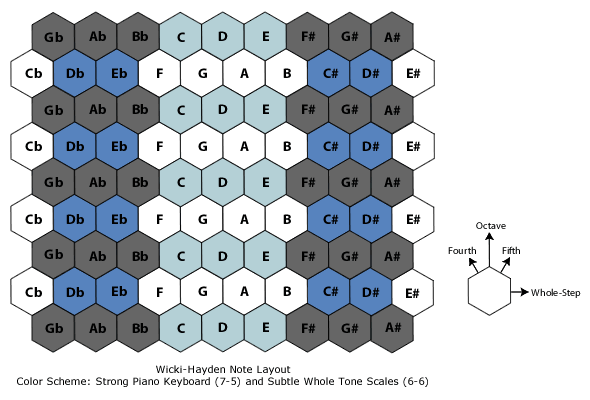
Strong Piano (7–5) and Subtle Whole Tone Scale (6–6) Color Scheme

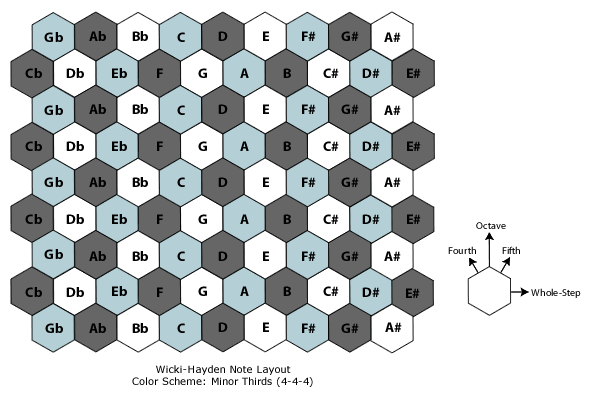
Minor Thirds Color Scheme (4–4–4)

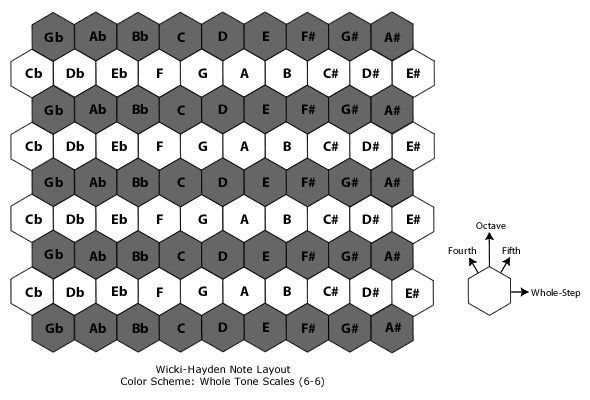
Whole Tone Scale (6–6) Color Scheme

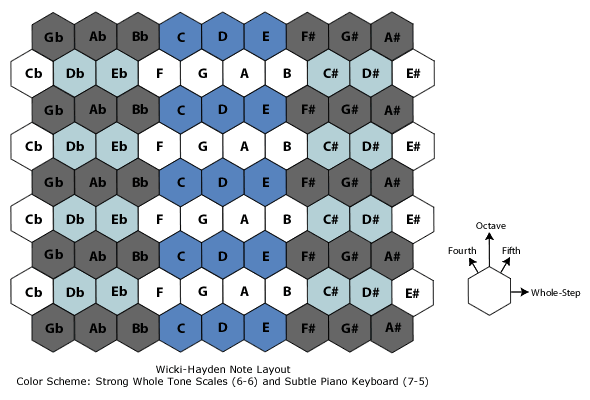
Strong Whole Tone Scale (6–6) and Subtle Piano (7–5) Color Scheme

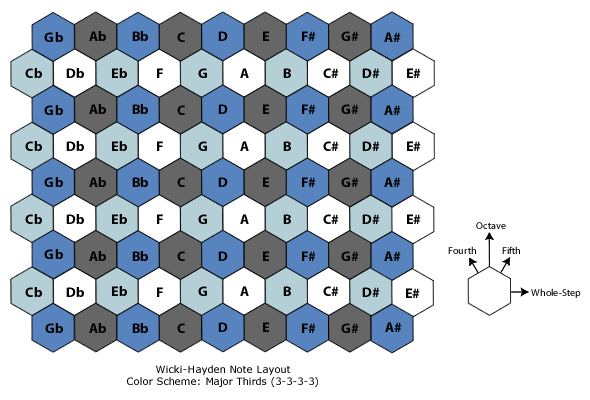
Major Thirds Color Scheme (3–3–3–3)

The color schemes above divide the 12 basic notes of the chromatic scale into groups in different ways:

- Piano (7–5): two asymmetrical groups of 7 (white keys) and 5 (black keys)
- Whole Tone Scale (6–6): two symmetrical groups of notes a major second apart (6 notes per group)
- Minor Thirds (4–4–4): three symmetrical groups of notes a minor third apart (4 notes per group)
- Major Thirds (3–3–3–3): four symmetrical groups of notes a major third apart (3 notes per group)

(Note that the whole tone scale (6–6) color scheme by itself is not very practical for the Wicki–Hayden layout since this pattern is already the basis for the physical layout of the keys—each row is a whole tone scale. It is more useful when combined with the piano (7–5) color scheme, particularly for better orientation along the vertical axis.)

== Instruments using the layout ==
- Hayden duet concertinas.
- HexBoard MIDI Controller.
- Striso uses a Wicki-Hayden inspired layout, with an angle to create a more clear pitch height direction.
- Apple iPhone/iPod/iPad apps: Musix, MIDIHayden (both defunct), Musix Pro.
- Android apps: Hexiano, IsoKeys (both outdated).
- Home build electronic MIDI instruments like the Melodicade.
- Jammer/Thummer.
- LinnStrument can use a grid-based Wicki-Hayden layout via MIDImech software or MicroLinn firmware.

== See also ==
- Duet concertina
- Generalized keyboard
- Jankó keyboard
- Harmonic table note layout
- Isomorphic keyboard
