= Caroline Bosanquet =

British cellist and composer

Rosamund Caroline Bosanquet (1940-2013) was a British cellist, music teacher, and composer, known especially for her book The Secret Life of Cello Strings: Harmonics for Cellists.

== Early life and education ==
The daughter of Lancelot Stephen Bosanquet, a mathematics professor at University College London, and his wife Isabel Mary Linfoot, Caroline Bosanquet was born on 3 March 1940. She gained a Bachelor of Music degree from Durham University and studied cello and piano at the Royal Academy of Music, and later with Christopher Bunting.

== Career ==
Bosanquet was active as a teacher throughout her career. She was particularly interested in incorporating Alexander Technique into her teaching, and published articles on its use in music education. In her late forties, she became interested in composition, and her music has been widely performed. Her most famous composition is her Elegy in memoriam Joan Dickson, which has been widely played due to its inclusion on the ABRSM cello Grade 8 syllabus. She was a member of staff at Cambridge College of Arts and Technology.

=== The Secret Life of Cello Strings ===
In 1996 Bosanquet published "The Secret Life of Cello Strings: Harmonics for Cellists", a method book designed to aid cellists in playing harmonics. In the introduction, Bosanquet stated that she was intrigued by the appearance of harmonics in places such as “the ethereal notes at the end of Bruch’s Kol Nidrei, the bell-like pentatonic notes in Dvorak’s Cello Concerto, the spectacular leaps in the second movement of Elgar’s Cello Concerto, the glissando harmonics in Shostakovich’s Cello Sonata, the march in Britten’s Cello Sonata and the magical sound of four-part cellos playing high-stopped harmonics in Arvo Pärt’s Fratres; glissando stopped harmonics in the March of Britten's cello sonata; and sudden changes of pitch and colour on single notes in Webern's Three Pieces.” She took a logical and scientific approach to categorising the possible harmonics on the cello, possibly inspired by her father's related work in the field of Fourier transforms. The book guides the player progressively through the different harmonics that can be played, including maps of the nodes of the cello string.

== Death ==
Bosanquet died of cancer, aged 72, on 20 January 2013.
