= Lancelot Stephen Bosanquet =

British mathematician

Lancelot Stephen Bosanquet (26 December 1903 St. Stephen's-by-Saltash, Cornwall, England – 10 January 1984 Cambridge) was a British mathematician who worked in analysis, especially Fourier series.

His daughter, Rosamund Caroline Bosanquet (1940–2013) was a British cellist, music teacher and composer.
