= George Secor =

American composer (1943–2020)

George Secor (November 8, 1943 – March 2, 2020) was an American musician, composer and music-theorist from Chicago. He was the discoverer of miracle temperament and eponym of the secor interval.

As an inventor, Secor and Hermann Pedtke's Motorola Scalatron (1974) is an example of a Bosanquet generalized keyboard featuring a multicolored arrangement of 240 tunable oval keys, about which Secor said: "There is not much point in using this alternative keyboard for systems below 31 tones in the octave." However, "even if it were completely impractical musically, it would make a wonderful prop for a futuristic movie". Though its synthesizer capacities may not reach performance level, according to Easley Blackwood: "It has rock-steady tuning capabilities; you can always count on it to be right." George demonstrating the micro-tonal keyboard instrument can be seen in this demonstration video.

George was also an accomplished musician and proponent of the Moschino Free-Bass Accordion system.

== Moschino accordion ==
A YouTube channel with some of George's performances on Moschino accordions illustrates his abilities on their unique keyboard, which allows for chromatic runs and open chords with the left-hand buttons, a free-bass system, rather than the more common Stradella bass system (which has fewer bass notes), plus preset chord buttons.

Secor was interviewed in 2018 about the origin and organization of the Moschino accordion system here.

The system is explained in a video. Additionally, a written discussion of the organization of the system, including Georges own explanations and diagrams is included on accordionists.info.

== Secor interval ==
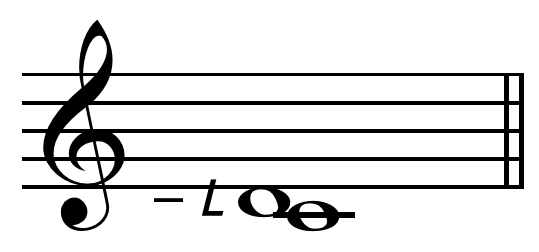
7-limit 8:7 septimal whole tone.

In music, a secor is the interval of 116.7 cents ( ( 18 / 5 )^{^{1 / 19}} ) named after George Secor. Secor devised it to allow a close approximation, generated from a single interval, to Harry Partch's 43 tone just intonation scale. All 11-limit consonances are approximated to within 3.32 cents.

It is approximated in 31, 41, and 72 equal temperament.. For tuning purposes, a secor of seven steps of 72 equal temperament is often used.

Two secors (233.4 cents) approximate an 8:7 interval (231.17 cents), a septimal whole tone. Three of these 8:7 intervals (693.51 cents), or 6 secors (700.2 cents), approximate a fifth (701.96 cents). A neutral third of 11/9 (347.41 cents) is approximated by 3 secors (350.1 cents).

== Miracle temperament ==
In music, miracle temperament is a regular temperament discovered by George Secor in 1974 which has the eponymous secor as a generator, serving as both the 15:14 and 16:15 semitones. Because 15:14 and 16:15 are equated, their ratio 225:224 $\left(\tfrac{15}{14}\div\tfrac{16}{15} = \tfrac{225}{224}\right)$ is tempered out, and two secors give an 8:7 interval, a septimal whole tone. Three of these 8:7 intervals, or six secors, make up a fifth, so that 1029:1024 $\left(\tfrac{3}{2}\div\left(\tfrac{8}{7}\right)^3 = \tfrac{1029}{1024}\right)$ is also tempered out. This gives the seven-limit version of miracle.

A septimal whole tone of 8:7 as we have seen is approximated by two secors, and a neutral third of 11:9 by three secors. In miracle, a minor third plus a septimal whole tone is also equated with the 11th harmonic. This means that the gap between a minor third plus a septimal whole tone $\left(\tfrac{8}{7} \times \tfrac{6}{5} = \tfrac{48}{35}\right)$ and the 11th harmonic (an 11:8 ratio), 385:384 $\left(\tfrac{11}{8}\div\tfrac{48}{35} = \tfrac{385}{384}\right)$, is also tempered out. Miracle, therefore, is the temperament tempering out 225:224, 1029:1024 and 385:384 at the same time.

For tuning purposes, a secor of seven steps of 72 equal temperament can be used. While this also tempers out 4375:4374 (the ragisma), doing this is not regarded as a part of the definition of miracle temperament.

Miracle temperament, particularly in the ten note Miracle scale and the distributionally even scale known as Blackjack. The twenty-one note Blackjack scale is derived from twenty successive secors and has been used by several composers, including New York composer Joseph Pehrson.

s is a secor, q is the difference between 10 secors and 1 octave, and r is the difference between s and q. If the Miracle scale is:

0    1    2    3    4    5    6    7    8    9       0'
 s    s    s    s    s    s    s    s    s    s    +q
 q +r q +r q +r q +r q +r q +r q +r q +r q +r q +r +q

then the Blackjack scale is:

0 >0 1 >1 2 >2 3 >3 4 >4 5 >5 6 >6 7 >7 8 >8 9 >9 <0 0'
 q  r q  r q  r q  r q  r q  r q  r q  r q  r q  r  q

this may also be viewed as a chain of 20 secors:

>0 >1 >2 >3 >4 >5 >6 >7 >8 >9 0 1 2 3 4 5 6 7 8 9 <0
  s  s  s  s  s  s  s  s  s  s s s s s s s s s s s
