= Generalized keyboard =

Musical keyboards with regular arrangements of keys

A generalized keyboard is a musical keyboard, a type of isomorphic keyboard, with regular, tile-like arrangements usually with rectangular or hexagonal keys, developed for performing music in different tunings. They were introduced by Robert Bosanquet in the 1870s, and since the 1960s Erv Wilson has developed new methods of using and expanding them, proposing keyboard layouts (and some notations) including any scale made of a single generator within an "octave" (or more generally, period) of any size.

The generalized keyboard is one kind of symmetrical arrangement that represents pitches according to their relationship to each other – rather than their positions in specific scales such as in the familiar piano and organ keyboard – , as well as in sequence of pitch, unlike arrangements such as duet systems for concertinas and the array system keyboard. Bosanquet used chains of fifths to generate the mapping of the keys, with the pitches transposed into the space of an octave (or more generally, period) so that pitch determined the lateral position of keys, and the number of fifths, or any other interval used as generators, from the starting pitch its vertical position in the keyboard.

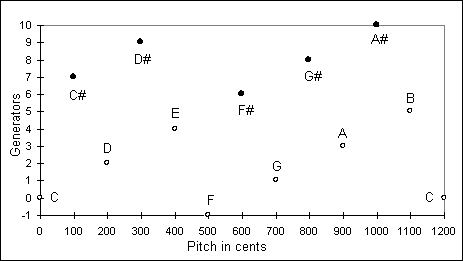
Schematic of one octave of a generalized keyboard mapped using a 700 cent generator

The layout of a typical musical keyboard

The coordinates of a key can be calculated using the size of the generator (in cents), where the vertical position is the number of generators away from the starting pitch, (positive or negative depending on whether they are in the sharp or flat direction), which Bosanquet rounded to the nearest semitone, giving 12 vertically aligned rows of keys in each octave. Wilson introduced alternate arrangements with combinations of seven or five (and in some cases, i.e., a division of the octave in 13 tones, eight) vertical lines of keys, and so Bosanquet keyboard sometimes is used to distinguish the original arrangement.

The angle between keys originally depended on the shape of the key and relative size of the generating fifth, but Bosanquet discovered fingering could sometimes be improved by reversing this angle; the angle can also be straightened out, or the spacing changed to better represent the keys' pitches, which alters vertical alignment. Generalized keyboards usually duplicate pitches mapped close to the front and rear edges of the arrangement in order to organize pitches for consistent fingering. This can result in very large arrangements depending on the shape of the keys and any modifications made to the basic design.

The possibility of the duplication of pitches occurs because the generalized keyboard is, in principle, a mapping of pitches onto a closed space in which intervals and chords have fixed shapes under transposition across the keyboard; thus a generalized keyboard is a useful tool for the analysis of harmonic structures.

== Implementations ==
Bosanquet's 1873 harmonium has rectangular keys more or less horizontal and aligned vertically with 12 lines in each octave. The width of octaves is slightly compressed from usual, and the keys are narrow and undercut at the front.

Arthur von Oettingen's 1914 Omnitonophonium harmonium has keys similar to Bosanquet's, but which aren't undercut (like Paul von Jankó's 1883 patent for his his 12-tone keyboard).

Arthur Fickenscher patented a keyboard in 1941 with rectangular keys overlapping in 12 staggered diagonal rows each representing the same named tones.

Larry Hanson devised keyboards in 1942 with rectangular, as well as staggered "7"-shaped keys. Erv Wilson later identified 19-tone subsets in Hanson's mappings that could be generated by chains of minor thirds.

Adriaan Fokker's 1951 31-tone organ used relatively short rectangular keys with sides relieved toward their fronts to form T-shaped playing surfaces, as well as longer rectangular keys in a concave arrangement for a pedalboard.

Erv Wilson patented a keyboard in 1967 with five perpendicular chromatic lines of keys in an octave, using fourths as generators. Robert Moog built a prototype with undercut round front rectangular keys.

Herman van der Horst built the first of four staggered square key Archiphones in 1970 for Anton de Beer.

George Secor's 1974 generalized keyboards for the Motorola Scalatron used oval keys skewed in diagonal rows.

Scott Hackleman and Erv Wilson designed a 19-tone generalized keyboard clavichord with oblong hexagonal keys in 1975, and marketed it as a kit.

Michel Geiss, Christian Braut and Philippe Monsire built the Semantic Daniélou, a 36-tone (out of 53 just intonation notes listed in the book Sémantique Musicale by Alain Daniélou) electronic instrument, on behalf of the author, using staggered square key button keyboards from two Cavagnolo Midy 20 master keyboards, where each parallel row of keys offers a transposition by one comma.

Harold Fortuin's 1994 Clavette midi controller uses straight alternating rows of switches which can be customized for different tunings by programming and with key overlay sheets. Bert Bongers built versions with 122 and 124 keys.

Harvey Starr manufactures Wilson Microzone skewed row hexagonal key midi controllers in 248 and 810-key models that can be programmed and the key surfaces organized into generalized as well as many other arrangements.

== See also ==
- Isomorphic keyboard
- Linear temperament
- Pitch space
- Chromatic button accordion
