= Robert Holford Macdowall Bosanquet =

English scientist and music theorist

Robert Holford Macdowall Bosanquet M.A., F.R.S., F.R.A.S.
- Born: 31 July 1841
- Died: 7 August 1912 (aged 71); Los Realejos, Tenerife, Spain
- Education: Eton College, Balliol College, Oxford
- Occupations: Scientist and music theorist
- Honours: Fellow of the Royal Astronomical Society, Fellow of the Royal Society

Robert Holford Macdowall Bosanquet FRS FRAS (31 July 1841 – 7 August 1912) was an English scientist and music theorist, and brother of Admiral Sir Day Bosanquet, and philosopher Bernard Bosanquet.

Bosanquet was the son of Rev. R. W. Bosanquet of Rock Hall, Alnwick, Northumberland. He was educated at Eton College, and took first class honors in Natural Science and Mathematics at Balliol College, Oxford, and later became a fellow of St. John's College. He was called to the Bar at Lincoln's Inn, London but worked mainly tutoring at Oxford, notably for the Natural Science School, and later was Professor of Acoustics at the Royal College of Music. He was a musician and an authority on organ construction, and published a number of experimental and theoretical papers on acoustics, electromagnetism and astronomy. He was elected Fellow of the Royal Astronomical Society in 1871 and Fellow of the Royal Society in 1890.

== Generalized keyboard ==
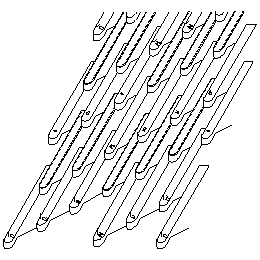
Bosanquet's generalized keyboard

Bosanquet developed classes for musical tunings used mapping pitches in a coordinate arrangement he called a generalized keyboard, contrasting with Henry Ward Poole's and Colin Brown's keyboards which were based on symmetry of key relationships. The keyboard was demonstrated in two instruments loaned permanently to the South Kensington Museum in 1876: a 4 1/2-octave harmonium tuned in 53 equal temperament with 84 keys per octave built by T. A. Jennings in 1872–3, and a 3-octave generalized keyboard organ built in 1875 with 48 notes per octave tuned to Hermann von Helmholtz' approximate just intonation (schismatic temperament) or 36 notes per octave tuned in quarter-comma meantone selected by means of draw stops. In 1877, speculating on papers about Indian śrutis, he relaxed the arrangement to permit mapping 22 equal temperament. He also invented a sensitive polariscope working independent of direction.

== Well temperament versus equal temperament ==
Marpurg is most likely at the source of a two-centuries misunderstanding that J. S. Bach would have been using the equal temperament for the performance of "Das Wohltemperierte Clavier", because of his publication "Versuch über die musikalische Temperatur", 1776, this misunderstanding was only much later first challenged by Robert Holford Bosanquet in "An Elementary Treatise on Musical Intervals and Temperament" 1876, pp. 29–30, but this position did not acquire fame. The above position of Bosanquet, that a distinction should be made between "well temperament" and "equal temperament" was rediscovered by H. Kelletat, and thoroughly defended and analysed historically in "Zur musikalischen Temperatur", 1960, especially p. 32. Thanks to this publication by H. Kelletat, almost all musicologists subscribe to this distinction nowadays.

== End of life ==
In 1890 he retired to Tenerife, spending summers in England. He died at his home called "El Castillo" (The Castle), near Los Realejos town, Tenerife Island (Canary Islands, Spain) in 1912.
