= Jankó keyboard =

Musical keyboard layout designed by Paul von Jankó

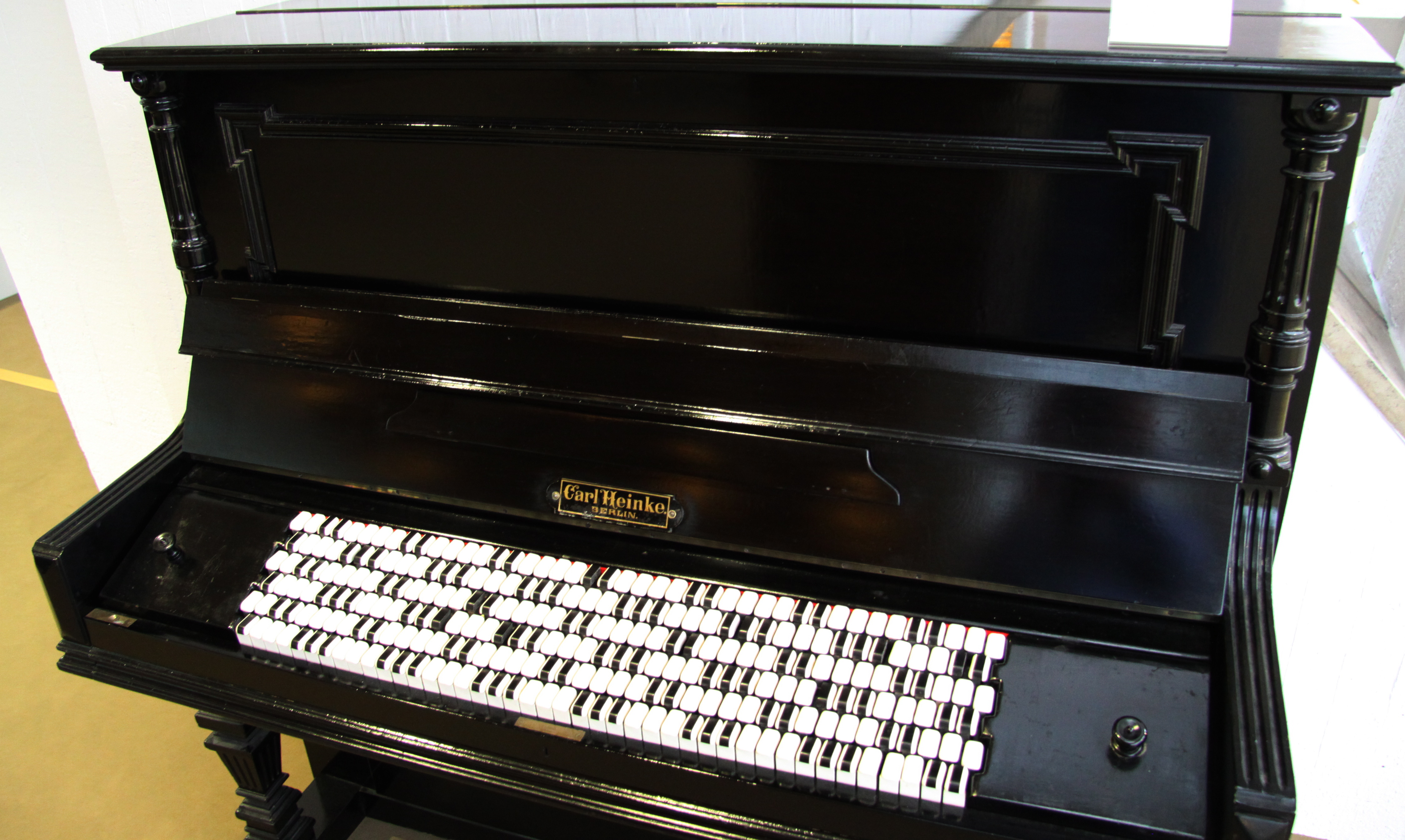
A Jankó keyboard

The Jankó keyboard is a musical keyboard layout for a piano designed by Paul von Jankó, a Hungarian pianist and engineer, in 1882. It was designed to overcome two limitations on the traditional piano keyboard: the large-scale geometry of the keys (stretching beyond a ninth, or even an octave, can be difficult or impossible for pianists with small hands), and the fact that each scale has to be fingered differently. Instead of a single row, the Jankó keyboard has an array of keys consisting of two interleaved manuals with three touch-points for every key lever, making six rows of keys. Each vertical column of three keys is a semitone away from the neighboring ones, which are in the alternate rows. Thus within each row the interval from one note to the next is a whole step.

This key layout results in each chord and scale having the same shape on the keyboard with the same fingerings regardless of key, so there is no change in geometry when transposing music. Furthermore, the use of multiple rows allows the pianist to more naturally follow the contour of their hand and accounts for the different lengths of the fingers. The configuration retains the colouring of traditional keyboards (white naturals, black sharps and flats) for pedagogical purposes.

Jankó keyboard layout

For an 88-note (full size) keyboard, there would be 264 keys in total, with each note playable by three keys in vertical alignment. In the picture above, the white keys have been coloured to show how the keys are interconnected. Instead of 123 cm (48 in) the keyboard is only 89 cm (35 in) wide, and the smaller key size allows reaching wider intervals.

The Jankó Keyboard caused a stir at the time of its invention, in large part due to its unique look and the intelligent design behind the keyboard. American piano manufacturer Decker Brothers put the keyboard into production around 1891, and the Paul de Janko Conservatory of Music was established in New York around the same time. There was even a manual written by W. Bradley Keeler called How to Play the New Keyboard.

Despite all this, the Jankó keyboard never achieved wide popularity. Music educators were not convinced that the benefits of the new keyboard were enough to challenge the traditional keyboard. Few performers were prepared to relearn their repertoire on a new keyboard with entirely different fingering. Both reasons left keyboard instrument manufacturers afraid to invest in a redesigned keyboard which promised to have only marginal commercial success.

In the 1920s American pianist Carl F. Schmitt, a onetime piano student of Janko, reported on his experience: “It happens that I was an ardent student and protagonist of said keyboard during my student days at the Royal Conservatory of Music in Leipzig, even studying under Janko himself. I brought back to this country a Blüthner upright furnished with said keyboard in the Summer of 1888. In the early part of 1889 I gave a recital on it before a musical society. Half of the recital was on a piano with the usual keyboard and the rest on my Janko piano. I mention these facts simply to show that I am qualified to speak on this subject.

"The Inventor, Paul de Janko, a native of Hungary, and a student at both the Vienna Conservatory and the Vienna University, brought out his invention about 1882. He proved its value by transforming himself from a mediocre pianist on the usual keyboard to a brilliant artist on his own. One of his pupils, a young lady of seventeen, already a fine performer on the usual keyboard played concerts on the Janko keyboard in the chief musical centers of Europe after only six months’ practice upon it, winning the unstinting praise of eminent musical critics. It was taken up by a number of pianists, particularly in Vienna, Leipsic and Dresden. Its study was made optional in the leading conservatories of those places. Janko societies were even formed. Some of the leading piano-makers of Germany and Austria furnished pianos to the trade, Janko-equipped, among them Blüthner of Leipsic and Bösendorfer of Vienna.

"The chief advantage of the Janko keyboard, and it is the one you did not mention, lies in its being truly chromatic. No one key is more difficult to play on than another. It is just as convenient to pass the thumb under on a black key immediately after a white key has been played by another finger as to do the opposite. As the C major scale is played, so all other major scales are played, the fingers being in exactly the same relative positions. The same is true of figures of notes or of any progression of chords. Consequently it is true of an entire piece. To transpose a piece into any other key all that is required is to start the fingers in the new key and let them move exactly as before. The practice required for technical efficiency is vastly reduced. Any technical difficult mastered in one key is automatically mastered in all keys. Similar intervals are exactly the same distance apart. The ordinary piano is very complex in this respect. Take, for instance, the major third D–F♯ and the similar major third B–D♯. The keyspace for the latter is about one-quarter inch greater than that of the former. And these differences together with others account for the immense amount of practice required for proficiency on the usual keyboard.

"Another point of advantage is that there is plenty of room for stout fingers on the Janko keyboard. No squeezing fingers into the narrow space between the black keys as on the usual one. In spite of all of these and other advantages the innovation went to sleep after a life of about twenty years. Besides the reasons given by you in your [earlier] article its apparent complexity (apparent, not real) deterred many from attempting to learn it.”

Many embodiments of this keyboard have appeared since its conception. Jankó himself (in German patent 25852, dated 14 January 1884) originally chose a key shape which resembled the slim, black keys on the familiar piano keyboard. A year later (in German patent 32138, dated 1 July 1885) the keys became wider and shorter. Other inventors have filed patents for keyboards which are substantially similar to his design, differing most often in key shape or instrument to which those keyboards are affixed, including:

- John Trotter, English Patent 3404, 4 March 1811
- William A. B. Lunn devised in 1843 under the name of Arthur Wallbridge a sequential keyboard with two parallel rows of keys, each in whole tones
- Miguel Theodore de Folly, Useful Registered Design Number 448 for a geometrical keyboard for the pianoforte, 1845
- Gould and Marsh, US patent no. 24021, 1859
- Edgar, US patent no. 119335, 1871
- Cramer, US patent no. 152726, 1874
- McChesney, US patent no. 161806, 1875
- Stewart, US patent no. 334484, 1886
- Adams, US patent no. 682014, 1901
- Nordbö, US patent no. 1202882, 1916
- Barnett, US patent no. 1958227, 1934
- Reuther, US patent no. 2203393, 1940
- Firestone, US patent no. 2417639, 1945

== See also ==
- Harpejji
- Isomorphic keyboard
- Generalized keyboard
