= Schismatic temperament =

Musical tuning system

A schismatic temperament is a musical tuning system that results from tempering the schisma of 32805:32768 (1.9537 cents) to a unison. It is also called the schismic temperament, Helmholtz temperament, or quasi-Pythagorean temperament.

== Construction ==
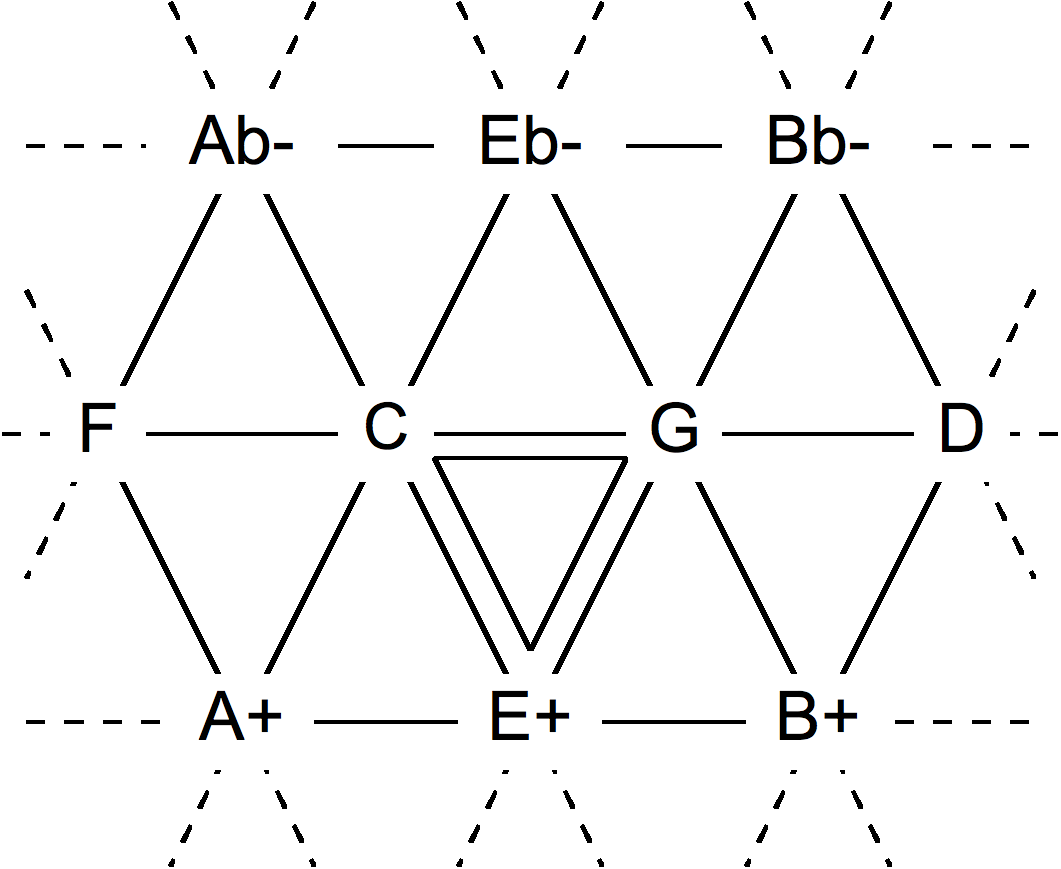
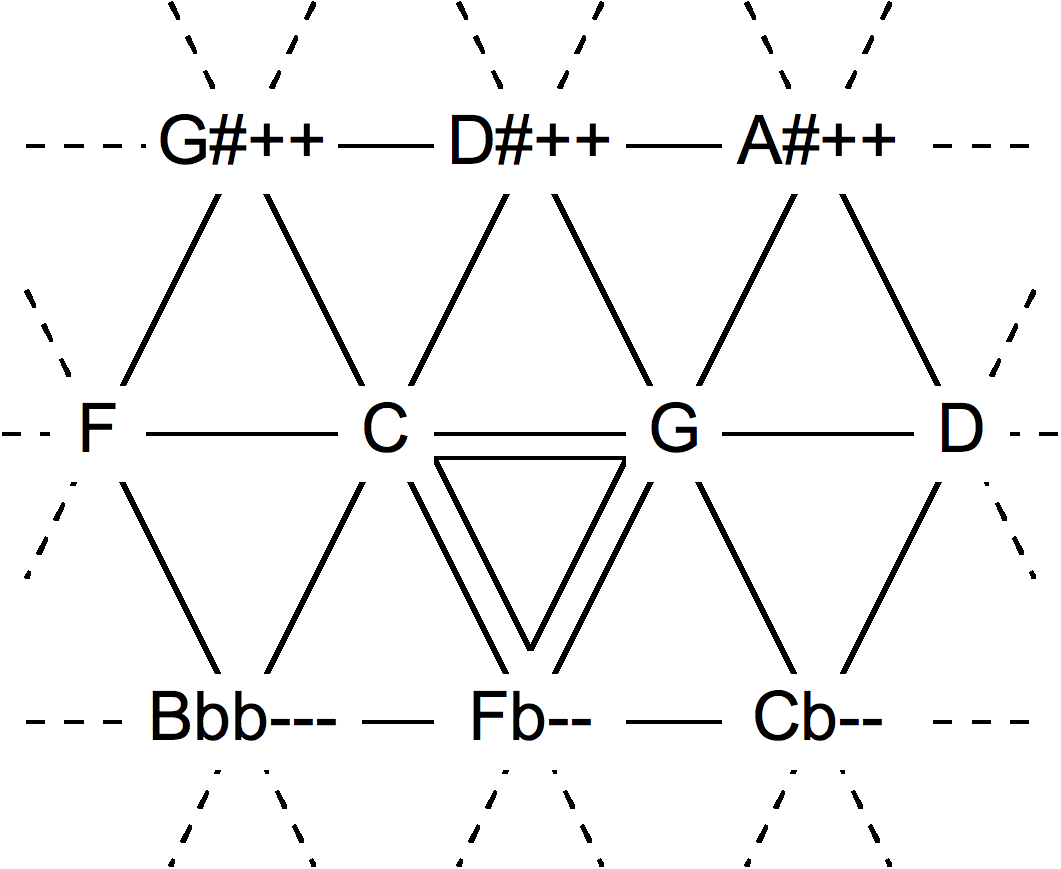
Tonnetz for Pythagorean tuning (above) and schismatic temperament (below)

In Pythagorean tuning all notes are tuned as a number of perfect fifths (701.96 cents). The major third above C, E, is considered four fifths above C. This causes the Pythagorean major third, E+ (407.82 cents), to differ from the just major third, E♮ (386.31 cents): the Pythagorean third is sharper than the just third by 21.51 cents (a syntonic comma).

C — G — D — A+ — E+

Ellis's "skhismic temperament" instead uses the note eight fifths below C, F♭-- (384.36 cents), the Pythagorean diminished fourth or schismatic major third. Though spelled "incorrectly" for a major third, this note is only 1.95 cents (a schisma) flat of E♮, and thus more in tune than the Pythagorean major third. As Ellis puts it, "the Fifths should be perfect and the Skhisma should be disregarded [accepted/ignored]."

E+ $\approx$ F♭--
F♭-- — C♭-- — G♭-- — D♭-- — A♭- — E♭- — B♭- — F — C

In his eighth-schisma "Helmholtzian temperament" the note eight fifths below C is also used as the major third above C. However, in the "skhismic temperament" pure perfect fifths are used to construct an approximate major third, while in the "Helmholtzian temperament" approximate perfect fifths are used to construct a pure major third. To raise the Pythagorean diminished fourth 1.95 cents to a just major third each fifth must be narrowed, or tempered, by 1.95/8 = 0.24 cents. Thus, the fifth becomes 701.71 cents instead of 701.96 cents. As Ellis puts it, "the major Thirds are taken perfect, and the Skhisma is disregarded [tempered out]."

E♮ $\approx$ F♭--

E♮ — $\approx$C♭-- — $\approx$G♭-- — $\approx$D♭-- — $\approx$A♭- — $\approx$E♭- — $\approx$B♭- — $\approx$F — C

Compare Pythagorean vs. Skhismic.

== Comparison with other tunings ==
Whereas schismatic temperaments achieve a ratio with a number of fifths, each tempered by a fraction of the schisma; meantone temperaments achieve a ratio with fifths, each tempered by a fraction of the syntonic comma (81:80, 21.51 cents). As meantone temperaments are often described by what fraction of the syntonic comma is used to alter the perfect fifths, schismatic temperaments are often described by what fraction of the schisma is used to alter the perfect fifths (thus quarter-comma meantone temperament, eighth-schisma temperament, etc.).

In both eighth-schisma tuning and quarter-comma meantone the octave and major third are just, but eighth-schisma has much much more accurate perfect fifths and minor thirds (less than a quarter of a cent off from just intonation). However, quarter-comma meantone has a large advantage in that the major third and minor third are spelled as such, whereas in schismatic tunings, they're represented by the diminished fourth and augmented second (if spelled according to their construction in the tuning). This places them well outside the span of a single diatonic scale and requires both a larger number of pitches and more microtonal pitch-shifting when attempting common-practice Western music.

Various equal temperaments lead to schismatic tunings which can be described in the same terms. Dividing the octave by 53 provides an approximately 1/29-schisma temperament; by 65 a 1/5-schisma temperament, by 118 a 2/15-schisma temperament, and by 171 a 1/10-schisma temperament. The last named, 171, produces very accurate septimal intervals, but they are hard to reach, as to get to a 7/4 requires 39 fifths. The −1/11-schisma temperament of 94, with sharp rather than flat fifths, gets to a less accurate but more available 7:4 by means of 14 fourths. Eduardo Sabat-Garibaldi also had an approximation of 7:4 by means of 14 fourths in mind when he derived his 1/9-schisma tuning.

== History of schismatic temperaments ==
Historically significant is the eighth-schisma tuning of Hermann von Helmholtz and Norwegian composer Eivind Groven. Helmholtz had a special Physharmonica (a harmonium by Schiedmayer) with 24 tones to the octave. Groven built an organ internally equipped with 36 tones to the octave which had the ability to adjust its tuning automatically during performances; the performer plays a familiar 12-key (per octave) keyboard and in most cases the mechanism will choose from among the three tunings for each key so that the chords played sound virtually in just intonation. A 1/9-schisma tuning has also been proposed by Eduardo Sabat-Garibaldi, who together with his students uses a 53-tone to the octave guitar with this tuning.

Mark Lindley and Ronald Turner-Smith argue that schismatic tuning was briefly in use during the late medieval period. This was not a temperament but merely 12-tone Pythagorean tuning. Justly tuned fifths and fourths generate a reasonable schismatic tuning and therefore schismatic is in some respects an easier way to introduce approach justly tuned thirds into a Pythagorean harmonic fabric than meantone. However, the result suffers from the same difficulties as just intonation – for example, the wolf B-G♭ here arises all too easily when availing oneself of the concordant schismatic substitutions just outlined – so it is not surprising that meantone temperament became the dominant tuning system by the early Renaissance. Helmholtz's and Groven's systems get around some, but not all, of these difficulties by including multiple tunings for each key on the keyboard, so that a particular note can be tuned as G♭ in some contexts and F♯ in others, for example.
