= Musical temperament =

Musical tuning system

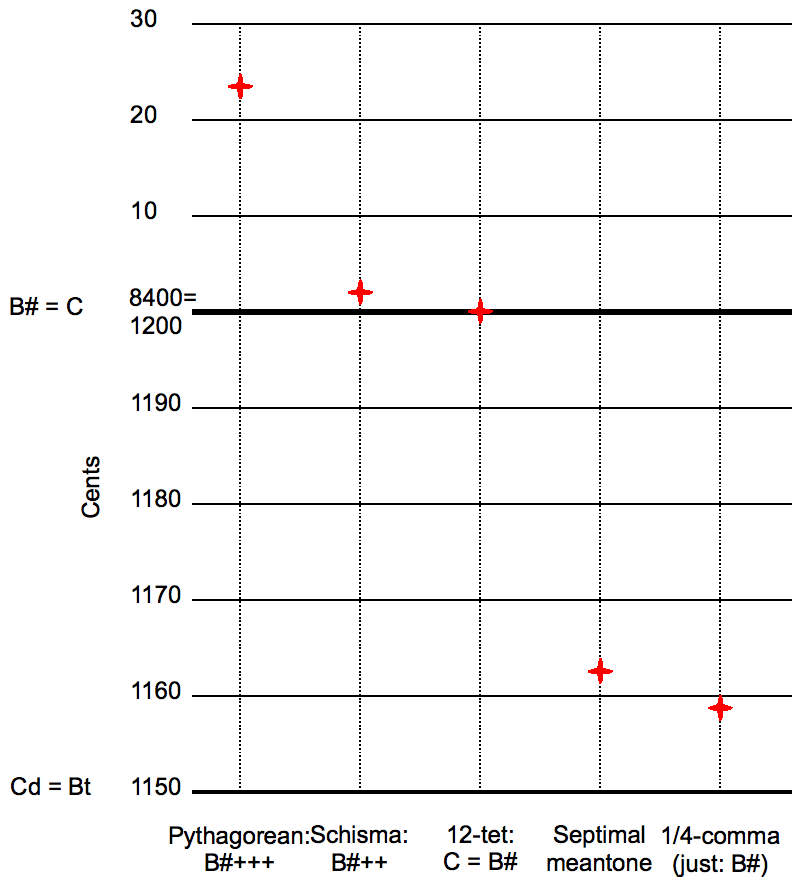
Comparison of notes derived from, or near, twelve perfect fifths (B♯).

A musical temperament is a tuning system that slightly compromises the pure intervals of just intonation to meet other requirements. These pure intervals are based on a perfect fifth that has an exact 3:2 pitch ratio, but tempering narrows or widens them to accommodate a broader range of tuning needs. Temperaments are especially important for fixed-pitch instruments such as keyboards and guitars, which lack any way to easily make fine pitch adjustments during performance.

Temperaments can be divided into two categories, regular and irregular. Regular temperaments are generated with a finite number of generator intervals, most commonly a tempered perfect fifth, and a period, usually the octave. These include 12-tone equal temperament, the most commonly used temperament today, and more generally meantone temperaments which were historically used. Irregular temperaments cannot be described with such a generation process, and include the historically used well temperaments, which use an unequal sequence of twelve tempered fifths.

The development of well temperament allowed fixed-pitch instruments to play reasonably well in all of the keys. The famous Well-Tempered Clavier by Johann Sebastian Bach takes full advantage of this breakthrough, with pieces written in all 24 major and minor keys. However, while unpleasant intervals (such as the wolf interval) were avoided, the sizes of intervals were still not consistent between keys, and so each key still had its own character. This variation led in the 18th century to an increase in the use of 12-tone equal temperament, in which the frequency ratio between each pair of adjacent notes on the keyboard was made equal. In other words, the ratio between two notes that were one octave apart was kept pure, and the twelve notes in between the octave were equally spaced from one another. This allowed music to be transposed between keys without changing the relationship between notes.

== Definition ==
Temperament, in music, the accommodation or adjustment of the imperfect sounds by transferring a part of their defects to the more perfect ones, in order to remedy, in some degree, the false intervals of those instruments, the sounds of which are fixed; as the organ, harpsichord, piano-forte, etc.
Temperament is what the Italians call participatione, or system temperato, because it is founded on temperature; that is, on the diminution of some intervals and augmentation of others, by which it partakes of the diatonic and chromatic systems.

"Temperament refers to the various tuning systems for the subdivision of the octave," the four principal tuning systems being Pythagorean tuning, just intonation, mean-tone temperament, and equal temperament. In just intonation, every interval between two pitches corresponds to a whole number ratio between their frequencies, allowing intervals varying from the highest consonance to highly dissonant. For instance, 660 Hz / 440 Hz (a ratio of 3 / 2) constitutes a fifth, and 880 Hz / 440 Hz (2 / 1) an octave. Such intervals (termed "just") have a stability, or purity to their sound, when played simultaneously (assuming they are played using timbres with harmonic partials) because pure intervals do not waver or beat regularly. The proportions of their frequencies can be expressed as whole numbers.

If one of those pitches is adjusted slightly to deviate from the just interval, a trained ear can detect this change by the presence of beats, which are periodical oscillations in the note's intensity. If, for example, two sound signals with frequencies that vary just by 0.5 Hz are played simultaneously, both signals are out of phase by a very small margin, creating the periodical oscillations in the intensity of the final sound (caused by the superposition of both signals) with a repetition period of 2 seconds (following the equation Tr=1/Δf, Tr being the period of repetition and Δf being the difference in frequencies between both signals), because the amplitude of the signals is only in phase, and therefore has a maximum superposition value, once every period of repetition.

=== Acoustic physics ===
When a musical instrument with harmonic overtones is played, the ear hears a composite waveform that includes a fundamental frequency (e.g., 440 Hz) and those overtones (880 Hz, 1320 Hz, 1760 Hz, etc.)—a series of just intervals. These just intervals, due to their acoustic nature, are present in many contexts: such as plucked strings and the human voice.

The waveform of such a tone (as pictured on an oscilloscope) is characterized by a shape that is complex compared to a simple (sine) waveform, but remains periodic. As the ratios between the frequencies of two tones depart further from simple integer ratios, fewer harmonics coincide, and the shape of the composite waveform becomes less periodic. This 'rougher'-looking waveform may be perceived as having reduced consonance.

Every interval created by two sustained tones creates a third tone, called a differential (or resultant) tone. This third tone is equal to the lower pitch subtracted from the higher pitch. This third tone then creates intervals with the original two tones, and the difference between these is called a second differential. Differentials are soft and difficult for the untrained ear to detect. Nevertheless, these relationships between differentials play a large role in determining which tunings create consonant sound. Perceptual studies suggest that maximum roughness is perceived when the frequency of these differentials between harmonics lie at about a quarter of a 'critical bandwith', which varies with overall frequency.

== Meantone temperament ==
Before meantone temperament became widely used in the Renaissance, the most commonly used tuning system was Pythagorean tuning, a system of just intonation that tuned every note in a scale from a progression of pure perfect fifths. Thus, aside from the octave, the only highly consonant intervals in Pythagorean tuning were the perfect fifth and its inversion, the perfect fourth. This was suitable for the majority of harmonic practice in the music of medieval Europe.

In the Renaissance, musicians made much more use of tertian harmony, adopting major and minor thirds (and their harmonic inversions, major and minor sixths) as consonances. However, the major third of Pythagorean tuning is rather dissonant (at a ratio of 81:64), differing from a just major third (a ratio of 5:4) by an amount known as syntonic comma.

Their solution, laid out by Pietro Aron in the early 16th century and well-known to keyboard players by that point, was a series of tunings referred to as meantone temperaments. These temper the interval of a perfect fifth slightly narrower than in just intonation, and then proceed much like Pythagorean tuning, but using tempered fifths instead of the just fifths. With the fifth flattened by a quarter-comma, the syntonic comma is reduced to a unison, making the major thirds just and the minor thirds also flat by a quarter-comma, rather than a full comma, relative to its ratio in just intonation. While all fifths in this tuning system now beat slightly, this beating effect on the fifths is only one quarter as strong as the beating effect on the thirds of Pythagorean tuning in the case of quarter-comma meantone, since a sequence of four fifths makes up one third. Hence, this was considered an acceptable compromise by Renaissance musicians.

Pythagorean tuning also had a second problem, which non-extended meantone temperaments do not solve, the problem of modulation (see below) in a 'broken' circle of fifths. A series of 12 just fifths as in Pythagorean tuning does not return to the original pitch, but rather differs by a Pythagorean comma, which makes that tonal area of the system more or less unusable. In meantone temperament, this effect is even more pronounced. The fifth over the break in the circle is known as the wolf interval, as its intense beating was likened to a "howling". 53 equal temperament provides an extension of Pythagorean tuning, and 31 equal temperament is used nowadays to extend quarter-comma meantone.

In the words of William Hubbard's Musical Dictionary (1908), an anomalous chord is a "chord containing an interval" that "has been made very sharp or flat in tempering the scale for instruments of fixed pitches".

== Well temperament and equal temperament ==
Most just intonation tunings have the problem that they cannot modulate to a different key (a very common means of expression throughout the common practice period of music) without discarding many of the tones used in the previous key, thus for every key to which the musician wishes to modulate, the instrument must provide a few more strings, frets, or holes for them to use. When building an instrument, this can be very impractical.

Well temperament is the name given to a variety of different systems of temperament that were employed to solve this problem, in which some keys are more in tune than others, but all can be used. This phenomenon gives rise to infinite shades of key-colors, which are lost in the modern standard version: 12-tone equal temperament (12-TET). Unlike meantone temperament, which alters the fifth to "temper out" the syntonic comma, 12-TET tempers out the Pythagorean comma, thus creating a cycle of fifths that repeats itself exactly after 12 steps.

This allowed the intervals of tertian harmony, thirds and fifths, to be fairly close to their just counterparts (the fifths almost imperceptibly beating, the thirds a little milder than the syntonic beating of Pythagorean tuning), while permitting the freedom to modulate to any key and by various means (e.g. common-tone and enharmonic modulation, see modulation). This freedom of modulation also allowed substantial use of more distant harmonic relationships, such as the Neapolitan chord, which became very important to Romantic composers in the 19th century.

== Frequently used equal temperament scales ==
- 12 tone equal temperament
- 15 tone equal temperament
- 17 tone equal temperament
- 19 tone equal temperament
- 22 tone equal temperament
- 24 tone equal temperament
- 31 tone equal temperament
- 34 tone equal temperament
- 41 tone equal temperament
- 53 tone equal temperament
- 72 tone equal temperament

== See also ==
- Piano tuning
- Comma
- List of meantone intervals
- Whole-tone scale
- Pythagorean interval
- Mathematics of musical scales
- Schismatic temperament
