= A12 scale =

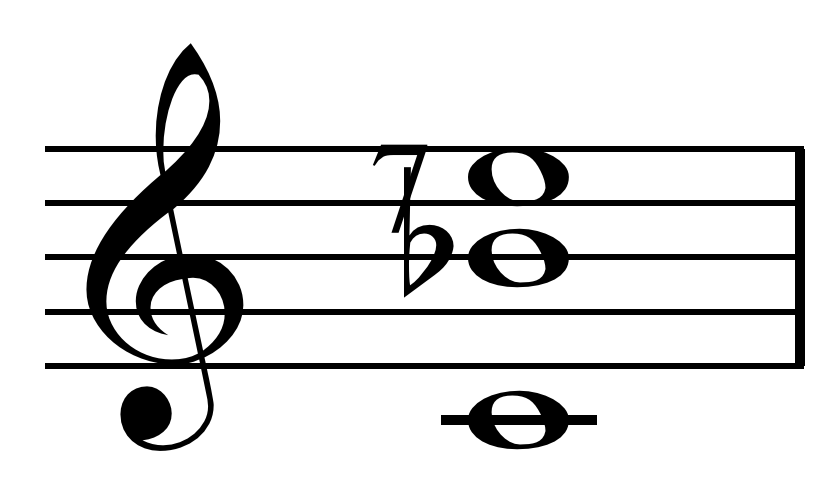
A12 triad (4:7:10) in conventional notation.

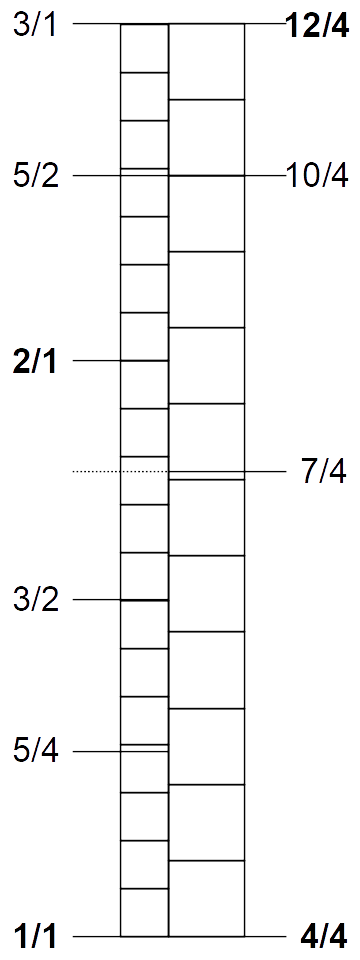
Octave 12-tet (left) compared with tritave 12-tet (right)

A12 is a non-octave-repeating scale or musical tuning featuring twelve steps to the tritave. As twelve steps to the octave is based on a triad of harmonics 4:5:6 (root, major third, perfect fifth), A12 is based on a triad of harmonics 4:7:10 (root, harmonic seventh, and compound major third). Discovered by Heinz Bohlen between 1972 and 1973, it was named "A12" by Enrique Moreno. Bohlen considered this scale less logically consistent than the Bohlen–Pierce scale, which has thirteen steps in the twelfth.

Step	Ratio	Audio	Cents (just)	Audio	Cents (ET)	Difference
0	1/1		0		0	0
1	11/10		165.00		158.50	-6.50
2	6/5		315.64		316.99	1.35
3	30/23		459.99		475.49	15.50
4	10/7		617.49		633.99	16.50
5	11/7		782.49		792.48	9.99
6	7/4		968.83		950.98	-17.85
7	21/11		1119.46		1109.48	-9.99
8	21/10		1284.47		1267.97	-16.50
9	23/10		1441.96		1426.47	-15.49
10	5/2		1586.31		1584.97	-1.35
11	11/4		1751.32		1743.46	-7.86
12	3/1		1901.96		1901.96	0

== See also ==
- 833 cents scale
- Bohlen–Pierce scale
