= Heinz Bohlen =

Electronics and communications engineer

Heinz P. Bohlen (26 June 1935 – 2 February 2016) was a microwave electronics and communications engineer.

He designed and described numerous non-octave musical scales (alternative musical tunings and temperaments), many based on combination tones, including the Bohlen–Pierce scale in 1972 (independently discovered by John R. Pierce in 1984, also a microwave electronics and communications engineer, six years later and Kees van Prooijen in 1978), the A12 scale, and the 833 cents scale.

Bohlen began to question and investigate tunings in the early 1970s when a friend and graduate student at the Hamburg Hochschule für Musik und Theater asked him to begin recording concerts at the school. Bohlen asked students why all their music used twelve-tone equal temperament, including the octave, and, dissatisfied with the answers, began to investigate alternate tunings.
