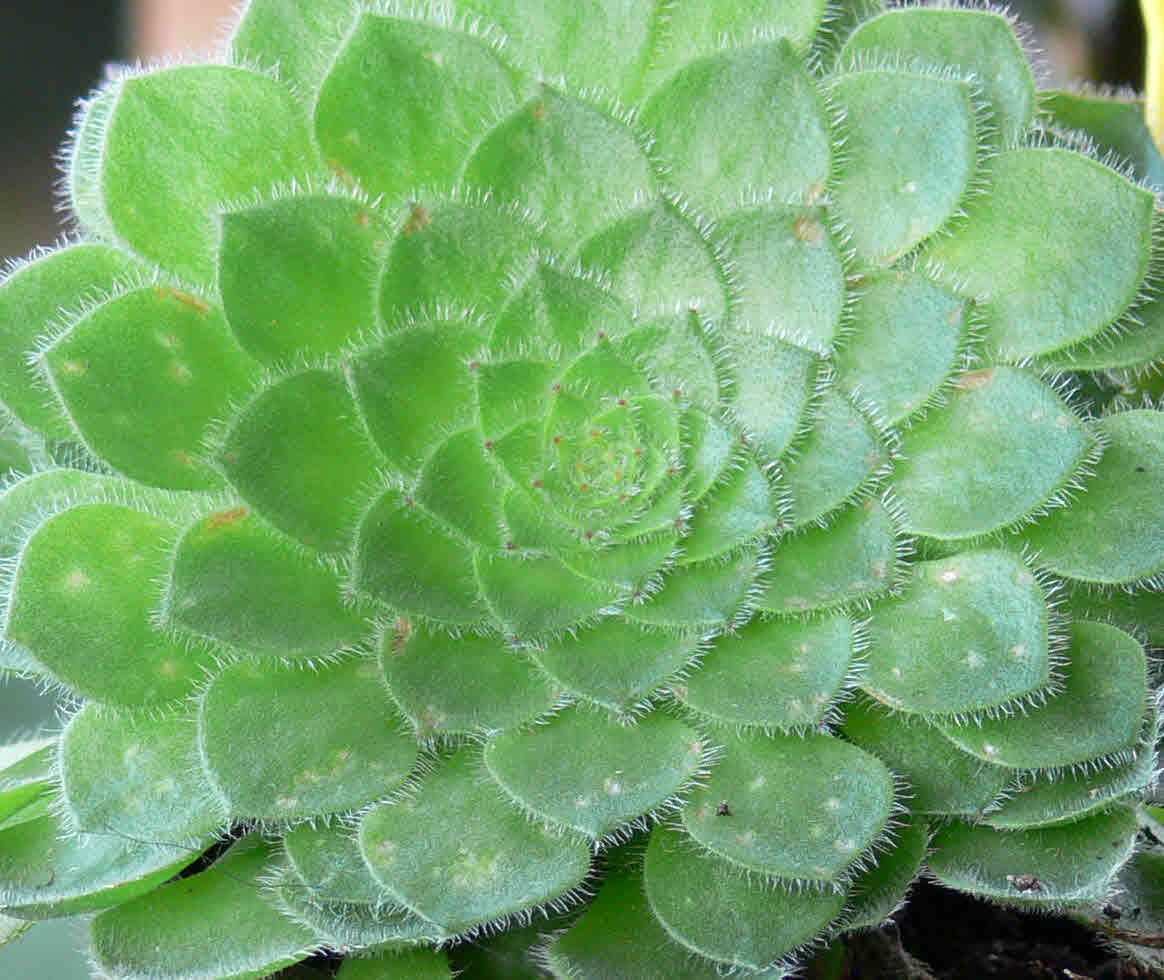

Scientific classification
- Kingdom: Plantae
- Clade: Tracheophytes
- Clade: Angiosperms
- Clade: Eudicots
- Order: Saxifragales
- Family: Crassulaceae
- Genus: Aeonium
- Species: A. tabuliforme

Binomial name
- Aeonium tabuliforme Webb & Berthel.

Synonyms
- Aeonium berthelotianum Bolle; Aeonium macrolepum Webb ex Christ; Aeonium umbelliforme Knoche; Sempervivum complanatum A.DC.; Sempervivum tabuliforme Haw.

= Aeonium tabuliforme =

Species of flowering plant endemic to Tenerife

Aeonium tabuliforme, the flat-topped aeonium or saucer plant, is a species of succulent plant in the family Crassulaceae, native and endemic to Tenerife in the Canary Islands. It is low-growing, typically reaching about 5 cm (2.0 in) high but up to 45 cm (18 in) in diameter. It grows on moist, north-facing cliffs and ledges at low altitude. A mass of fleshy, hairy, bright green leaves in flat rosettes is produced on short unbranched stems, often on vertical surfaces. This species is short-lived and dies after flowering. Plants often take 3–4 years to flower, at which point they produce a tall (40–60 cm) raceme of yellow flowers.

The Latin specific epithet tabuliforme means "flat" (literally "table shaped").

This plant, which may be either biennial or perennial, is grown under glass in temperate regions. It has gained the Royal Horticultural Society's Award of Garden Merit. It requires excellent drainage, and leaf color is best in full sun. It is relatively disease-free, but may be susceptible to aphids and mealybugs.

The cultivar 'Variegata' features darker green leaves with white edges.

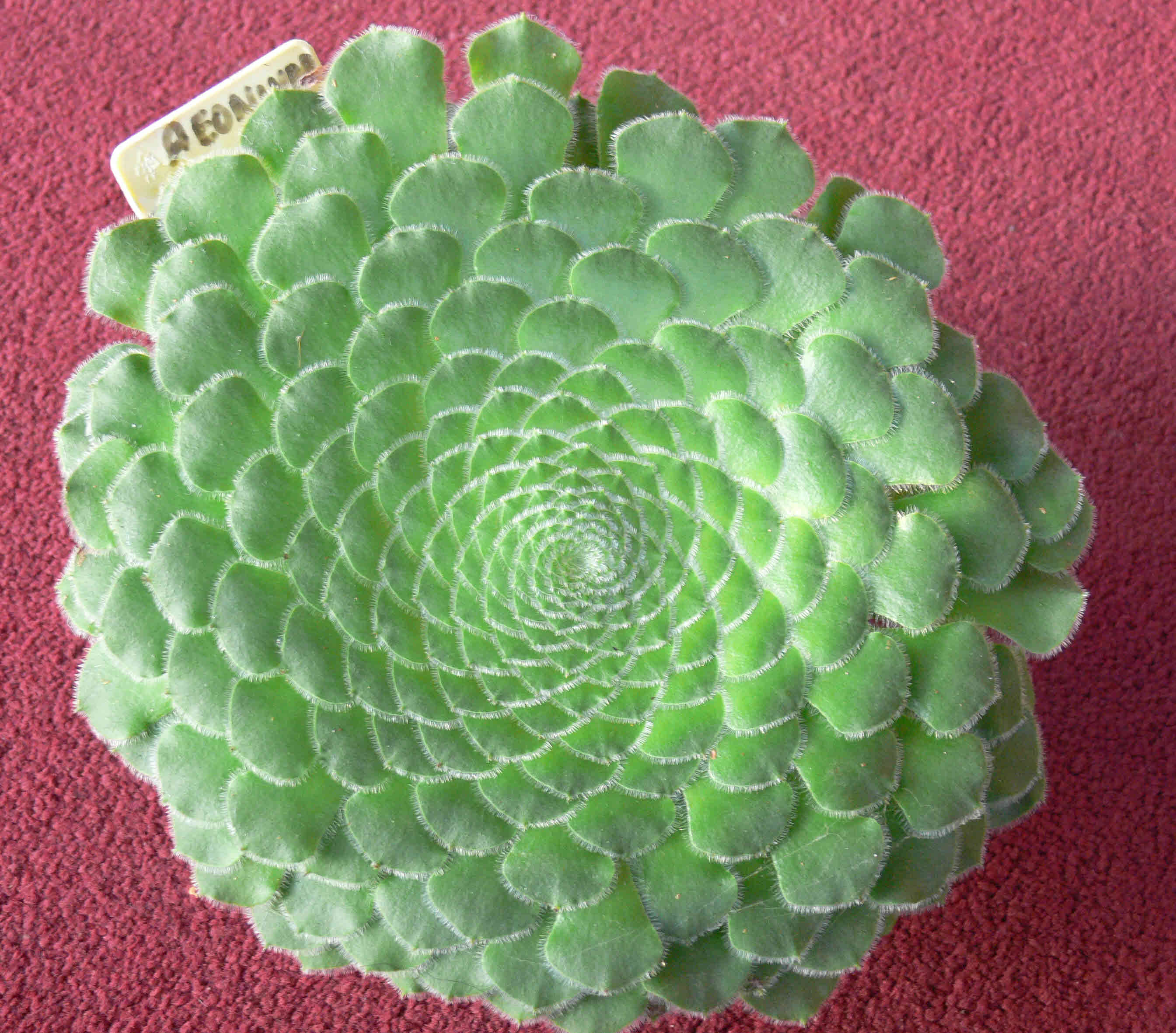

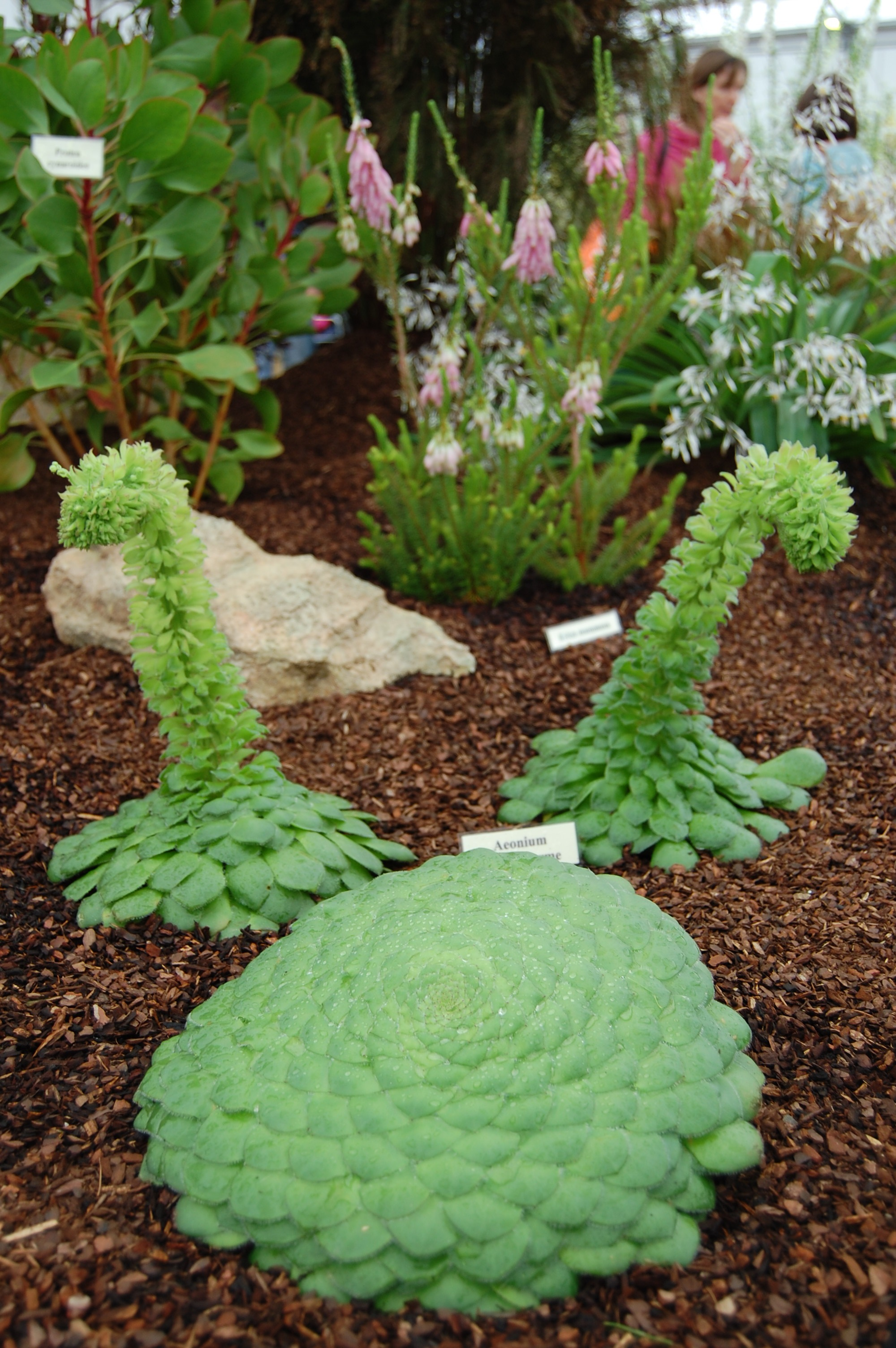
Three specimens, two with flower spikes

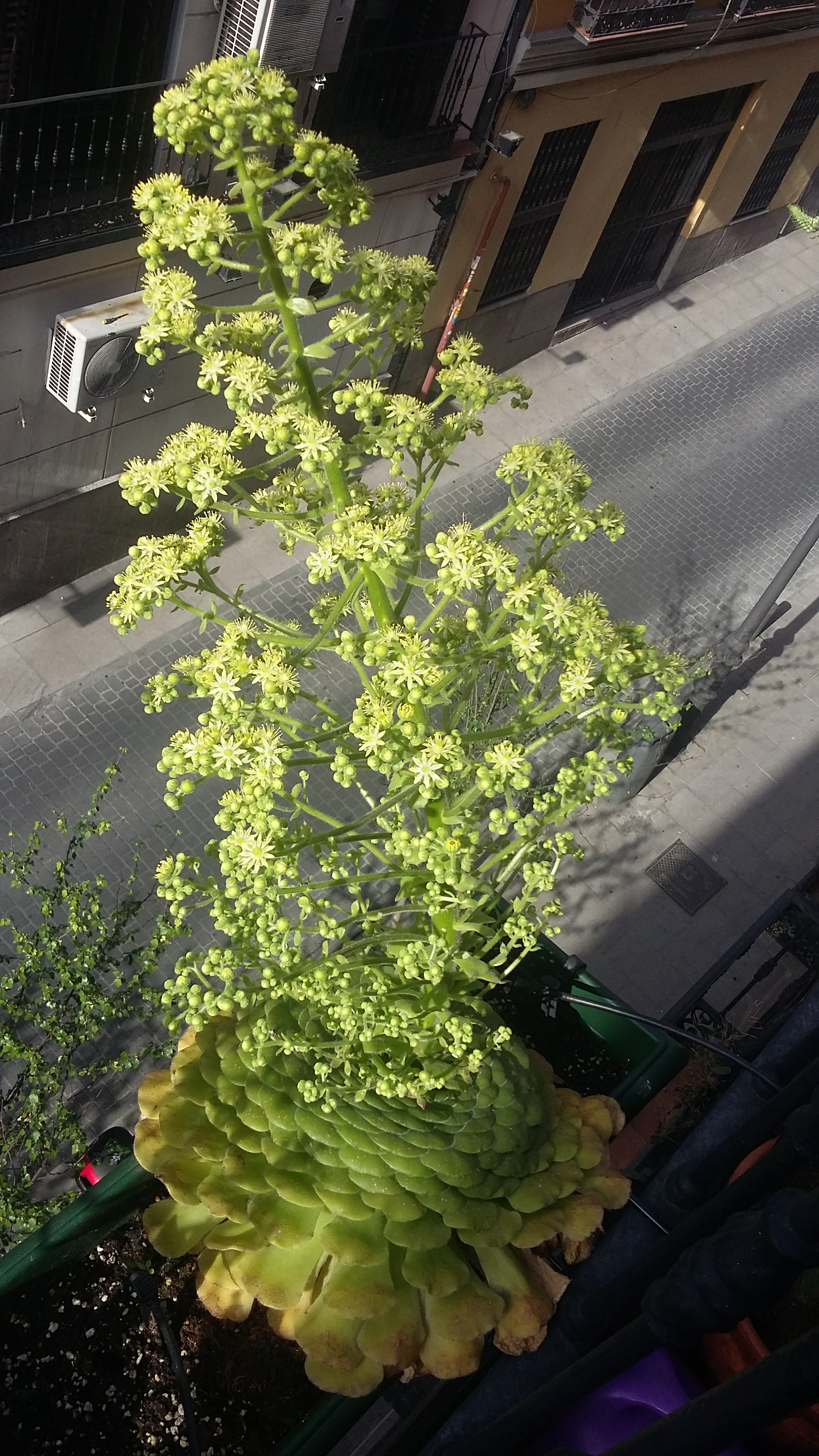
Flowers
