= Bohlen–Pierce scale =

Musical scale

Notation for the Bohlen-Pierce scale.

The Bohlen–Pierce scale is a thirteen tone scale and musical tuning system. It was first described in the 1970s. Instead of dividing the octave like a traditional scale, it spans an octave plus a perfect fifth.

== Background ==
Heinz Bohlen was curious why the octave should govern scales. After reading Paul Hindemith's explanation of tonality in The Craft of Musical Composition, Bohlen remained skeptical. He settled on combination tones as a model for a scale that would span a perfect twelfth. In 1972, Bohlen developed a version of the scale in just intonation and equal temperament.

Bohlen wrote about his invention in 1978. That same year, software engineer Kees van Prooijen independently discovered the same scale. In 1984, John R. Pierce, Max Mathews, and Linda A. Roberts published their own discovery of the scale. Pierce was the primary investigator of the project. Like Bohlen, he was also an electronic engineer by trade.

In a 1989 book, Mathews and Pierce acknowledged Bohlen's earlier discovery of the scale and renamed it Bohlen-Pierce.

== Structure ==
Just intonation 4:5:6 chord Bohlen-Pierce 3:5:7 chord BP 3:5:7:9 chord

BP semitone

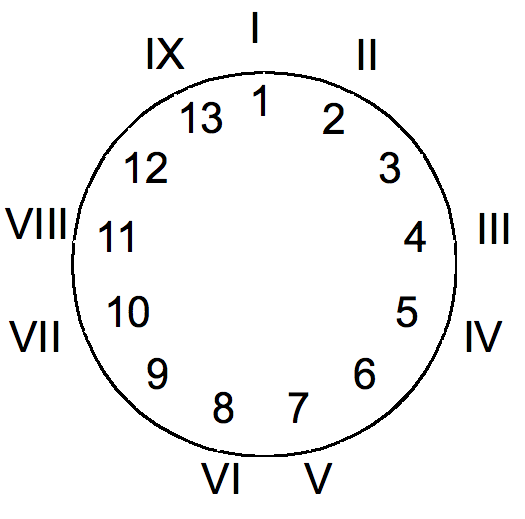
The 13 notes of the BP scale. The 9-note equal tempered version is marked in Roman numerals.

The Bohlen-Pierce (BP) scale eschews the 2:1 ratio of the octave. The scale is governed instead by a 3:1 ratio, which yields an interval spanning an octave plus a perfect fifth. This interval is called a tritave and it totals 1901.955 cents.

Instead of the traditional frequency ratio of 4:5:6 which forms a major chord, the BP scale is governed purely by odd overtones. The basic chord structure is 3:5:7. Just as the tonic, subdominant, and dominant chords can be used to derive a major scale, the BP system uses the chords in 3:5:7 ratios to form a scale with 13 steps. Each step has a frequency ratio of 3^{1/13}. There are thirteen possible BP keys. Modulation is possible through changing a single note.

The 3:5:7 chord comprises a lower interval of 6 semitones and an upper interval of 4 semitones. The overtones of a 3:5:7 chord coincide in similar ways as traditional major chords. The 5th partial of the first note coincides with the 3rd partial of the second. Overlapping harmonics are one of the signature features of consonance. A 1984 experiment found several BP chords were perceived as consonant by both musicians and untrained listeners.

The equal tempered version of the BP scale has 13 equal steps, from which a 9-tone subset scale can be derived (analogous to how the diatonic scale is a 7-tone subset of 12-tone equal temperament). Heinz Bohlen developed his own 9-step modes of the scale which he named after Greek letters.

== Music ==
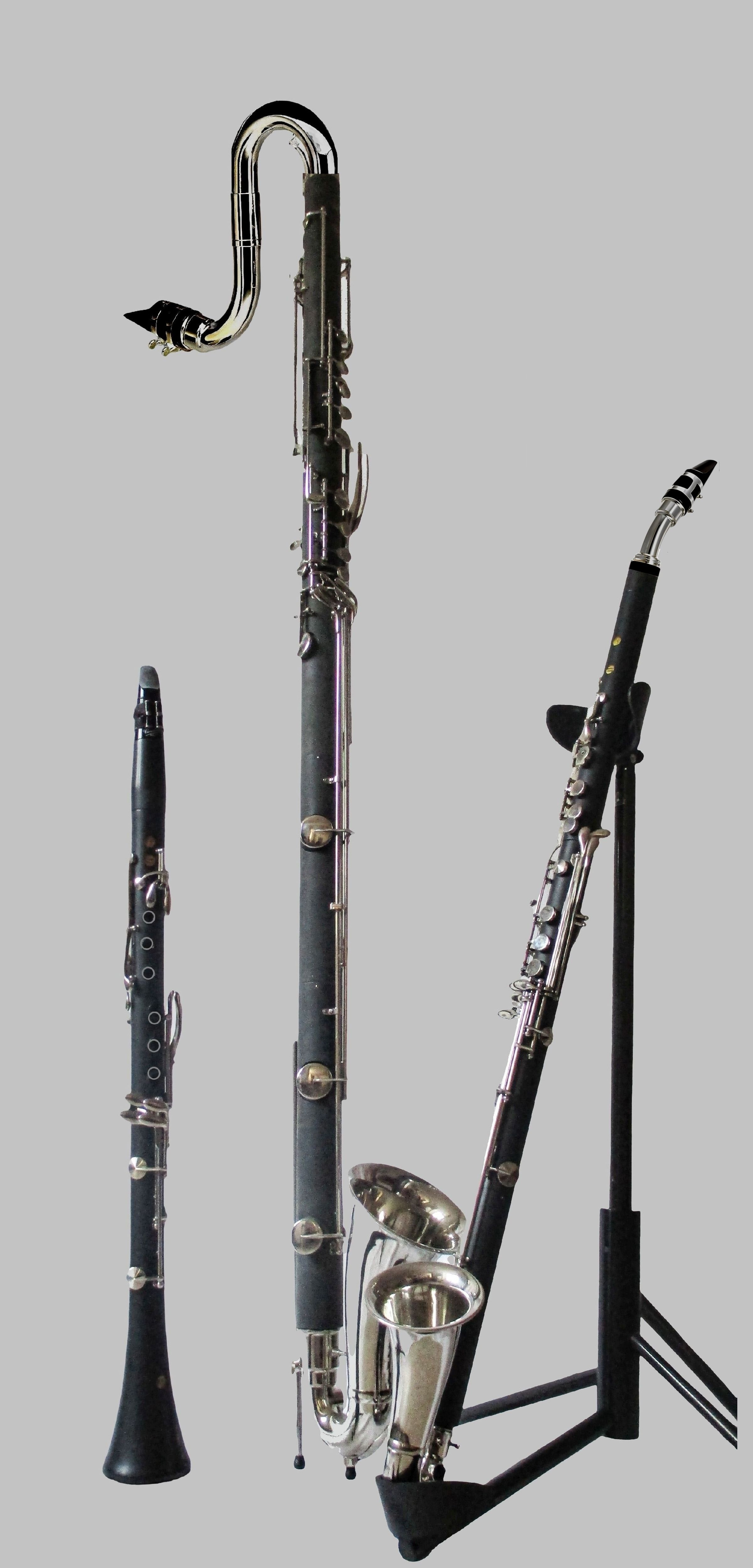
Bohlen-Pierce soprano, bass, and tenor clarinets.

The Bohlen-Pierce scale may sound odd due to social conditioning. Mathews and Pierce were certain that the scale was conducive to clear and memorable melodies. They were indifferent about its potential for counterpoint and functional harmony.

Clarinet maker Stephen Fox created a family of instruments in Bohlen-Pierce tuning at the instigation of composer Georg Hajdu.

Several composers have written with the Bohlen-Pierce scale:

- Curtis Roads, Clang-Ting.
- Jon Appleton.
- Richard Boulanger, Solemn Song for Evening (1990).
- Georg Hajdu
- Juan Reyes, ppP (1999-2000).
- Ami Radunskaya, "A Wild and Reckless Place" (1990).
- Charles Carpenter, Frog à la Pêche (1994) & Splat.
- Elaine Walker, Stick Men (1991), Love Song, and Greater Good (2011).

== See also ==
- Double reed
- Square wave
- Gamma scale
