= Kees van Prooijen =

Kees (Cornelis) van Prooijen (born 7 August 1952) is a creator of computer art. Although it does not bear his name, he independently discovered the Bohlen–Pierce scale, a non-octave-repeating scale based on the tritave and spectra containing odd harmonics, in 1978. Van Prooijen came across the scale through an investigation of continued fractions.

He also invented the Kees height, or an "expressibility" measure for complexity of just intonation pitch classes.
