= Varieties of equal temperament =

Musical tuning system with constant ratios between notes

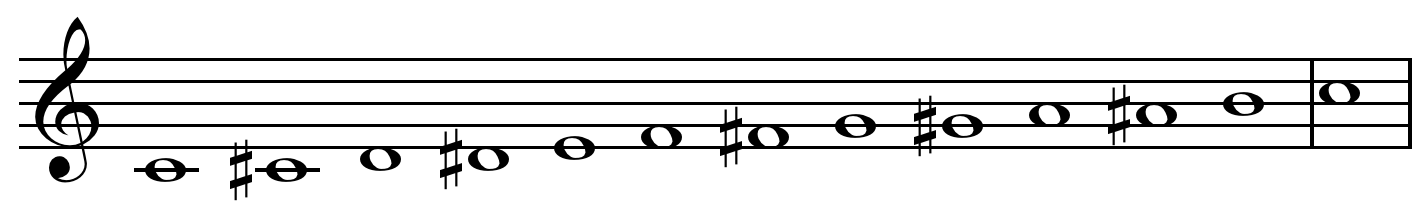
12-tone equal temperament chromatic scale on C, one full octave ascending, notated only with sharps.

An equal temperament is a musical temperament or tuning system that approximates just intervals by dividing an octave (or other interval) into steps such that the ratio of the frequencies of any adjacent pair of notes is the same. This system yields pitch steps perceived as equal in size, due to the logarithmic changes in pitch frequency.

In classical music, the most common tuning system since the 18th century has been an equal temperament that divides the octave into 12 parts, often called 12-tone equal temperament (12 TET). The system uses a logarithmic scale with a ratio equal to the 12th root of 2, ($\sqrt[12]{2}$ ≈ 1.05946). That resulting smallest interval, 1/12 the width of an octave, is called a semitone or half step.

In modern times, 12 TET is usually tuned relative to a standard pitch of 440 Hz, called A 440, meaning one note, A, is tuned to 440 hertz and all other notes are defined as some multiple of semitones away from it, either higher or lower in frequency. The standard pitch has not always been 440 Hz; it has varied considerably and generally risen over the past few hundred years.

Other equal temperaments divide the octave differently. For example, some music has been written in 19 TET and 31 TET, while the Arab tone system uses 24 TET.

Instead of dividing an octave, an equal temperament can also divide a different interval, like the equal-tempered version of the Bohlen–Pierce scale, which divides the just interval of an octave and a fifth (ratio 3:1), called a "tritave" or a "pseudo-octave" in that system, into 13 equal parts.

For tuning systems that divide the octave equally, but are not approximations of just intervals, the term equal division of the octave, or EDO can be used.

== Twelve-tone equal temperament ==
12-tone equal temperament, which divides the octave into 12 intervals of equal size, is the musical system most widely used today, especially in Western music.

=== History ===
The two figures frequently credited with the achievement of exact calculation of equal temperament are Zhu Zaiyu (also romanized as Chu-Tsaiyu. Chinese: 朱載堉) in 1584 and Simon Stevin in 1585. According to F. A. Kuttner, a critic of giving credit to Zhu, it is known that Zhu "presented a highly precise, simple and ingenious method for arithmetic calculation of equal temperament mono-chords in 1584" and that Stevin "offered a mathematical definition of equal temperament plus a somewhat less precise computation of the corresponding numerical values in 1585 or later."

The developments occurred independently.

Kenneth Robinson credits the invention of equal temperament to Zhu (Note: "Chu-Tsaiyu [was] the first formulator of the mathematics of 'equal temperament' anywhere in the world." — Robinson (1980), p. vii) and provides textual quotations as evidence. In 1584 Zhu wrote:

I have founded a new system. I establish one foot as the number from which the others are to be extracted, and using proportions I extract them. Altogether one has to find the exact figures for the pitch-pipers in twelve operations.

Kuttner disagrees and remarks that his claim "cannot be considered correct without major qualifications". Kuttner proposes that neither Zhu nor Stevin achieved equal temperament and that neither should be considered its inventor.

==== China ====
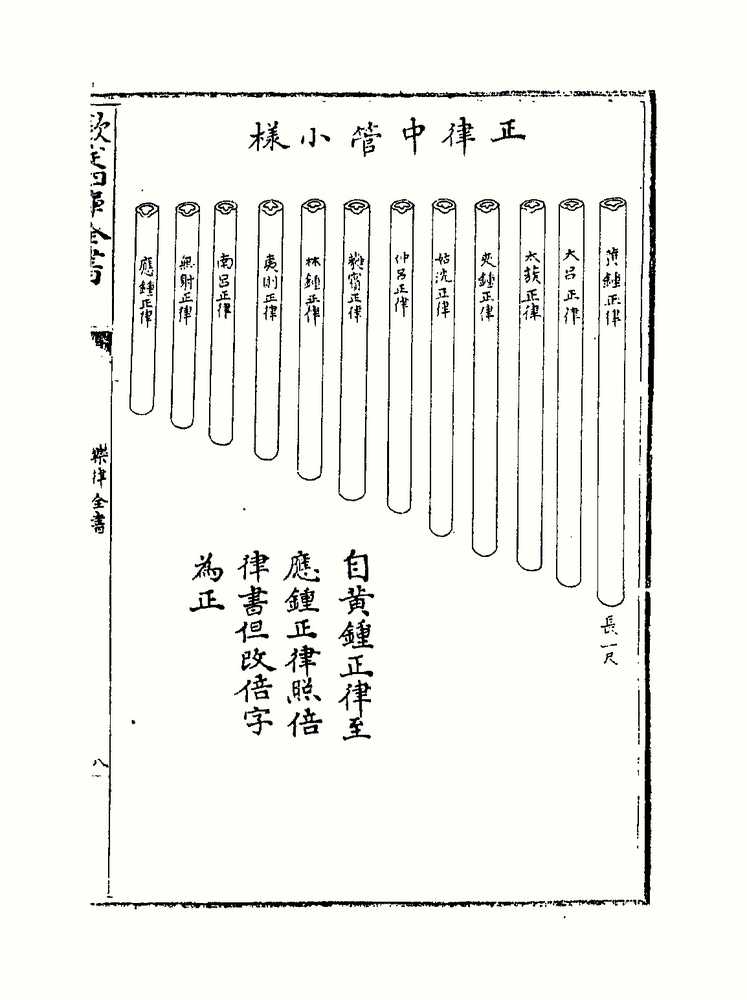
Zhu Zaiyu's equal temperament pitch pipes

Chinese theorists had previously come up with approximations for 12 TET, but Zhu was the first person to mathematically solve 12-tone equal temperament, which he described in two books, published in 1580 and 1584. Needham also gives an extended account.

Zhu obtained his result by dividing the length of string and pipe successively by $\sqrt[12]{2}$ ≈ 1.059463, and for pipe length by $\sqrt[24]{2}$ ≈ 1.029302, such that after 12 divisions (an octave), the length was halved.

Zhu created several instruments tuned to his system, including bamboo pipes.

==== Europe ====
Some of the first Europeans to advocate equal temperament were lutenists Vincenzo Galilei, Giacomo Gorzanis, and Francesco Spinacino, all of whom wrote music in it.

Simon Stevin was the first to develop 12 TET based on the twelfth root of two, which he described in van de Spiegheling der singconst (c. 1605), published posthumously in 1884.

Plucked instrument players (lutenists and guitarists) generally favored equal temperament, while others were more divided. In the end, 12-tone equal temperament won out. This allowed enharmonic modulation, new styles of symmetrical tonality and polytonality, atonal music such as that written with the 12-tone technique or serialism, and jazz to develop and flourish.

=== Seven-tone equal division of the fifth ===
Violins, violas, and cellos are tuned in perfect fifths (G D A E for violins and C G D A for violas and cellos), which suggests that their semitone ratio is slightly higher than in conventional 12-tone equal temperament. Because a perfect fifth is in 3:2 relation with its base tone, and this interval comprises seven steps, each tone is in the ratio of $\sqrt[7]{3/2}$ to the next (100.28 cents), which provides for a perfect fifth with ratio of 3:2, but a slightly widened octave with a ratio of ≈ 517:258 or ≈ 2.00388:1 rather than the usual 2:1, because 12 perfect fifths do not equal seven octaves. During actual play, however, violinists, violists, and cellists choose pitches by ear, and only the four unstopped pitches of the strings are guaranteed to exhibit this 3:2 ratio.

== Other equal temperaments ==
A comparison of some equal temperament scales

Five- and seven-tone equal temperament (5 TET and 7 TET ), with 240-cent and 171-cent steps, respectively, are fairly common.

=== 5-tone and 9-tone equal temperament ===
According to Jaap Kunst (1949), Indonesian gamelans are tuned to 5 TET, but according to Mantle Hood (1966) and Colin McPhee (1966) their tuning varies widely, and according to Michael Tenzer (2000) they contain stretched octaves. It is now accepted that of the two primary tuning systems in gamelan music, slendro and pelog, only slendro somewhat resembles five-tone equal temperament, while pelog is highly unequal; however, in 1972 Surjodiningrat, Sudarjana and Susanto analyze pelog as equivalent to 9 TET (133-cent steps).

=== 7-tone equal temperament ===
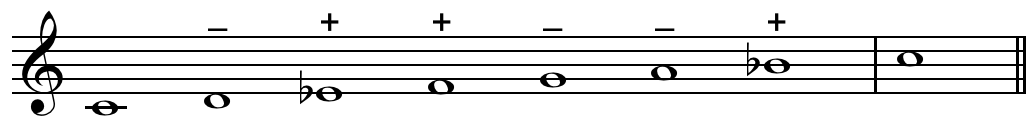
Approximation of 7 tet

A Thai xylophone measured by Morton in 1974 "varied only plus or minus 5 cents" from 7 TET. According to Morton,

"Thai instruments of fixed pitch are tuned to an equidistant system of seven pitches per octave ... As in Western traditional music, however, all pitches of the tuning system are not used in one mode (often referred to as 'scale'); in the Thai system five of the seven are used in principal pitches in any mode, thus establishing a pattern of nonequidistant intervals for the mode."

A South American Indian scale from a pre-instrumental culture measured by Boiles in 1969 featured 175-cent seven-tone equal temperament, which stretches the octave slightly, as in instrumental gamelan music.

Chinese music has traditionally used 7 TET. (Note: 'Hepta-equal temperament' in our folk music has always been a controversial issue.) (Note: From the flute for two thousand years of the production process, and the Japanese shakuhachi remaining in the production of Sui and Tang Dynasties and the actual temperament, identification of people using the so-called 'Seven Laws' at least two thousand years of history; and decided that this law system associated with the flute law.)

=== Various equal temperaments ===
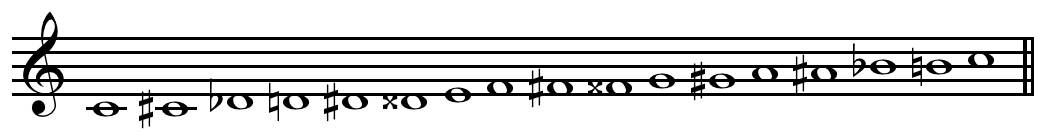
Easley Blackwood's notation system for 16 equal temperament: Intervals are notated similarly to those they approximate and there are fewer enharmonic equivalents.

Comparison of equal temperaments from 9 to 25 (Note: Sethares (2005) compares several equal temperaments in a graph with axes reversed from the axes in the first comparison of equal temperaments, and identical axes of the second.)

19 EDO
Many instruments have been built using 19 EDO tuning. Equivalent to 1/ 3 comma meantone, it has a slightly flatter perfect fifth (at 695 cents), but its minor third and major sixth are less than one-fifth of a cent away from just, with the lowest EDO that produces a better minor third and major sixth than 19 EDO being 232 EDO. Its perfect fourth (at 505 cents), is seven cents sharper than just intonation's and five cents sharper than 12-EDO's.

22 EDO
22 EDO is one of the most accurate EDOs to represent "superpythagorean" temperament (where 7:4 and 16:9 are the same interval). The perfect fifth is tuned sharp, resulting in four fifths and three fourths reaching supermajor thirds (9/7) and subminor thirds (7/6). One step closer to each other are the classical major and minor thirds (5/4 and 6/5).

23 EDO
23 EDO is the largest EDO that fails to approximate the 3rd, 5th, 7th, and 11th harmonics (3:2, 5:4, 7:4, 11:8) within 20 cents, but it does approximate some ratios between them (such as the 6:5 minor third) very well, making it attractive to microtonalists seeking unusual harmonic territory.

24 EDO
24 EDO, the quarter-tone scale, is particularly popular, as it represents a convenient access point for composers conditioned on standard Western 12 EDO pitch and notation practices who are also interested in microtonality. Because 24 EDO contains all the pitches of 12 EDO, musicians employ the additional colors without losing any tactics available in 12-tone harmony. That 24 is a multiple of 12 also makes 24 EDO easy to achieve instrumentally by employing two traditional 12 EDO instruments tuned a quarter-tone apart, such as two pianos, which also allows each performer (or one performer playing a different piano with each hand) to read familiar 12-tone notation. Various composers, including Charles Ives, experimented with music for quarter-tone pianos. 24 EDO also approximates the 11th and 13th harmonics very well, unlike 12 EDO.

29 EDO
29 is the lowest number of equal divisions of the octave whose perfect fifth is closer to just than in 12 EDO, in which the fifth is 1.5 cents sharp instead of 2 cents flat. Its classic major third is roughly as inaccurate as 12 EDO, but is tuned 14 cents flat rather than 14 cents sharp. It also tunes the 7th, 11th, and 13th harmonics flat by roughly the same amount, allowing 29 EDO to match intervals such as 7:5, 11:7, and 13:11 very accurately. Cutting all 29 intervals in half produces 58 EDO, which allows for lower errors for some just tones.

31 EDO
31 EDO was advocated by Christiaan Huygens and Adriaan Fokker and represents a rectification of quarter-comma meantone into an equal temperament. 31 EDO does not have as accurate a perfect fifth as 12 EDO (like 19 EDO), but its major thirds and minor sixths are less than 1 cent away from just. It also provides good matches for harmonics up to 11, of which the seventh harmonic is particularly accurate.

34 EDO
34 EDO gives slightly lower total combined errors of approximation to 3:2, 5:4, 6:5, and their inversions than 31 EDO does, despite having a slightly less accurate fit for 5:4. 34 EDO does not accurately approximate the seventh harmonic or ratios involving 7, and is not meantone since its fifth is sharp instead of flat. It enables the 600-cent tritone, since 34 is an even number.

41 EDO
41 is the next EDO with a better perfect fifth than 29 EDO and 12 EDO. Its classical major third is also more accurate, at only six cents flat. It is not a meantone temperament, so it distinguishes 10:9 and 9:8, along with the classic and Pythagorean major thirds, unlike 31 EDO. It is more accurate in the 13 limit than 31 EDO.

53 EDO
53 EDO has only had occasional use, but is better at approximating the traditional just consonances than 12, 19 or 31 EDO. Its extremely accurate perfect fifths make it equivalent to an extended Pythagorean tuning, as 53 is the denominator of a convergent to log_{2}(3). With its accurate cycle of fifths and multi-purpose comma step, 53 EDO has been used in Turkish music theory. It is not a meantone temperament, which put good thirds within easy reach by stacking fifths; instead, like all schismatic temperaments, the very consonant thirds are represented by a Pythagorean diminished fourth (C-F♭), reached by stacking eight perfect fourths. It also tempers out the kleisma, allowing its fifth to be reached by a stack of six minor thirds (6:5).

58 EDO
58 equal temperament is a duplication of 29 EDO, which it contains as an embedded temperament. Like 29 EDO it can match intervals such as 7:4, 7:5, 11:7, and 13:11 very accurately, as well as better approximating just thirds and sixths.

72 EDO
72 EDO approximates many just intonation intervals well, providing near-just equivalents to the 3rd, 5th, 7th, and 11th harmonics. 72 EDO has been taught, written and performed in practice by Joe Maneri and his students (whose atonal inclinations typically avoid any reference to just intonation whatsoever). As it is a multiple of 12, 72 EDO can be considered an extension of 12 EDO, containing six copies of 12 EDO starting on different pitches, three copies of 24 EDO, and two copies of 36 EDO.

96 EDO
96 EDO approximates all intervals within 6.25 cents, which is barely distinguishable. As an eightfold multiple of 12, it can be used fully like the common 12 EDO. It has been advocated by several composers, especially Julián Carrillo.

=== Equal temperaments of non-octave intervals ===
The equal-tempered version of the Bohlen–Pierce scale consists of the ratio 3:1 (1902 cents) conventionally a perfect fifth plus an octave (that is, a perfect twelfth), called in this theory a tritave, and split into 13 equal parts. This provides a very close match to justly tuned ratios consisting only of odd numbers. Each step is 146.3 cents, or $\sqrt[13]{3}$.

Wendy Carlos created three unusual equal temperaments that do not attempt to fit the octave. She dubbed these scales alpha, beta, and gamma. Each approximates different just intervals. Carlos used the alpha and beta scales on her 1986 album Beauty in the Beast.

== Related tuning systems ==
Equal temperament systems can be thought of in terms of the spacing of three intervals found in just intonation, most of whose chords are harmonically perfectly in tune—a good property not quite achieved between almost all pitches in almost all equal temperaments. Most just chords sound amazingly consonant, and most equal-tempered chords sound at least slightly dissonant. In C major those three intervals are:

- the greater tone T = 9/ 8 = the interval from C:D, F:G, and A:B;
- the lesser tone t = 10/ 9 = the interval from D:E and G:A;
- the diatonic semitone s = 16/ 15 = the interval from E:F and B:C.

Analyzing an equal temperament in terms of how it modifies or adapts these three intervals provides a quick way to evaluate how consonant various chords can possibly be in that temperament, based on how distorted these intervals are. (Note: For 12-pitch systems, either for a whole 12-note scale or for 12-note subsequences embedded inside some larger scale, use this analysis as a way to program software to microtune an electronic keyboard dynamically, or "on the fly", while a musician is playing. The object is to fine-tune the notes momentarily in use, and any likely subsequent notes involving consonant chords, to always produce pitches that are harmonically in tune, inspired by how orchestras and choruses constantly retune their overall pitch on long-duration chords for greater consonance than possible with strict 12 TET.)

== See also ==
- Diatonic and chromatic
- Electronic tuner
- Just intonation
- List of meantone intervals
- Microtonal music
- Microtuner
- Music and mathematics
- Musical acoustics
- Musical tuning
- Piano tuning
- Regular diatonic tuning

== Sources ==
- Boiles, J. (1969). "Terpehua though-song". Ethnomusicology. 13: 42–47.
- Cho, Gene Jinsiong (2003). The Discovery of Musical Equal Temperament in China and Europe in the Sixteenth Century. Lewiston, NY: Edwin Mellen Press.
- Duffin, Ross W. (2007). How Equal Temperament Ruined Harmony (and why you should care). New York, NY: W.W.Norton & Company. ISBN 978-0-39306227-4.
- Jorgensen, Owen (1991). Tuning. Michigan State University Press. ISBN 0-87013-290-3.
- Sethares, William A. (2005). Tuning, Timbre, Spectrum, Scale (2nd ed.). London, UK: Springer-Verlag. ISBN 1-85233-797-4.
- Surjodiningrat, W.; Sudarjana, P.J.; Susanto, A. (1972). Tone measurements of outstanding Javanese gamelans in Jogjakarta and Surakarta. Jogjakarta, IN: Gadjah Mada University Press. As cited by "The gamelan pelog scale of Central Java as an example of a non-harmonic musical scale". telia.com. Neuroscience of Music. Archived from the original on 27 January 2005.
- Stewart, P.J. (2006) [January 1999]. From galaxy to galaxy: Music of the spheres (Report). 8096295 – via academia.edu. Stewart, Philip (8 January 1999). "Alt. link 1". 269108386 – via researchgate.net. "Alt. link 2" – via Google docs.
- Khramov, Mykhaylo (26–29 July 2008). Approximation of 5-limit just intonation (PDF). Computer MIDI Modeling in Negative Systems of Equal Divisions of the Octave. The International Conference SIGMAP-2008. Porto. pp. 181–184. ISBN 978-989-8111-60-9.
