= Septimal =

Septimal may refer to:

- Septimal chromatic semitone, the interval 21:20, about 84.47 cents
- Septimal comma, a small musical interval in just intonation divisible by 7
- Septimal diatonic semitone, the interval 15:14, about 119.44 cents
- Septimal diesis, an interval with the ratio of 49:48, about 38.71 cents
- Septimal kleisma, an interval of approximately 7.7 cents
- Septimal major third, the musical interval with a 9:7 ratio of frequencies
- Septimal meantone temperament, the tempering of 7-limit musical intervals by a meantone temperament tuning
- Septimal minor third, the musical interval exactly or approximately equal to a 7/6 ratio of frequencies
- Septimal quarter tone, an interval with the ratio of 36:35, about 48.77 cents
- Septimal semicomma, an interval with the ratio 126/125, about 13.79 cents
- Septimal sixth-tone (or jubilisma), an interval with the ratio of 50:49, about 34.98 cents
- Septimal tritone, the interval 7:5, about 582.51 cents
- Septimal whole tone, the musical interval exactly or approximately equal to an 8/7 ratio of frequencies
- 7-limit tuning, musical instrument tunings that have a limit of seven

== See also ==
- Septenary, the base 7 numeral system
