= 96 equal temperament =

Musical scale with a 96-step octave

In music, 96 equal temperament, called 96-TET, 96-EDO ("Equal Division of the Octave"), or 96-ET, is the tempered scale derived by dividing the octave into 96 equal steps (equal frequency ratios). Each step represents a frequency ratio of $\sqrt[96]{2}$, or 12.5 cents. Since 96 factors into 1, 2, 3, 4, 6, 8, 12, 16, 24, 32, 48, and 96, it contains all of those temperaments. Most humans can only hear differences of 6 cents on notes that are played sequentially, and this amount varies according to the pitch, so the use of larger divisions of octave can be considered unnecessary. Smaller differences in pitch may be considered vibrato or stylistic devices.

== History and use ==
96-EDO was first advocated by Julián Carrillo in 1924, with a 16th-tone piano. It was also advocated more recently by Pascale Criton and Vincent-Olivier Gagnon.

== Notation ==
Since 96 = 24 × 4, quarter-tone notation can be used and split into four parts.

One can split it into four parts like this:

C, C↑, C↑↑/C↓↓, C↓, C, ..., C↓, C

As it can become confusing with so many accidentals, Julián Carrillo proposed referring to notes by step number from C (e.g. 0, 1, 2, 3, 4, ..., 95, 0)

Since the 16th-tone piano has a 97-key layout arranged in 8 conventional piano "octaves", music for it is usually notated according to the key the player has to strike. While the entire range of the instrument is only C_{4}–C_{5}, the notation ranges from C_{0} to C_{8}. Thus, written D0 corresponds to sounding C↑↑_{4} or note 2, and written A♭/G♯_{2} corresponds to sounding E_{4} or note 32.

== Interval size ==
Below are some intervals in 96-EDO and how well they approximate just intonation.

interval name	size (steps)	size (cents)	midi	just ratio	just (cents)	midi	error (cents)
octave	96	1200		2:1	1200.00		0.00
semidiminished octave	92	1150		35:18	1151.23		−1.23
supermajor seventh	91	1137.5		27:14	1137.04		+0.46
major seventh	87	1087.5		15:8	1088.27		−0.77
neutral seventh, major tone	84	1050		11:6	1049.36		+0.64
neutral seventh, minor tone	83	1037.5		20:11	1035.00		+2.50
large just minor seventh	81	1012.5		9:5	1017.60		−5.10
small just minor seventh	80	1000		16:9	996.09		+3.91
harmonic seventh	78	975		7:4	968.83		+6.17
supermajor sixth	75	937.5		12:7	933.13		+ 4.17
major sixth	71	887.5		5:3	884.36		+3.14
neutral sixth	68	850		18:11	852.59		−2.59
minor sixth	65	812.5		8:5	813.69		−1.19
subminor sixth	61	762.5		14:9	764.92		−2.42
perfect fifth	56	700		3:2	701.96		−1.96
minor fifth	52	650		16:11	648.68		+1.32
lesser septimal tritone	47	587.5		7:5	582.51		+4.99
major fourth	44	550		11:8	551.32		−1.32
perfect fourth	40	500		4:3	498.04		+1.96
tridecimal major third	36	450		13:10	454.21		−4.21
septimal major third	35	437.5		9:7	435.08		+2.42
major third	31	387.5		5:4	386.31		+1.19
undecimal neutral third	28	350		11:9	347.41		+2.59
superminor third	27	337.5		17:14	336.13		+1.37
77th harmonic	26	325		77:64	320.14		+4.86
minor third	25	312.5		6:5	315.64		−3.14
second septimal minor third	24	300		25:21	301.85		−1.85
tridecimal minor third	23	287.5		13:11	289.21		−1.71
augmented second, just	22	275		75:64	274.58		+0.42
septimal minor third	21	262.5		7:6	266.87		−4.37
tridecimal five-quarter tone	20	250		15:13	247.74		+2.26
septimal whole tone	18	225		8:7	231.17		−6.17
major second, major tone	16	200		9:8	203.91		−3.91
major second, minor tone	15	187.5		10:9	182.40		+5.10
neutral second, greater undecimal	13	162.5		11:10	165.00		−2.50
neutral second, lesser undecimal	12	150		12:11	150.64		−0.64
greater tridecimal 2/3-tone	11	137.5		13:12	138.57		−1.07
septimal diatonic semitone	10	125		15:14	119.44		+5.56
diatonic semitone, just	9	112.5		16:15	111.73		+0.77
undecimal minor second	8	100		128:121	97.36		−2.64
septimal chromatic semitone	7	87.5		21:20	84.47		+3.03
just chromatic semitone	6	75		25:24	70.67		+4.33
septimal minor second	5	62.5		28:27	62.96		−0.46
undecimal quarter-tone	4	50		33:32	53.27		−3.27
undecimal diesis	3	37.5		45:44	38.91		−1.41
septimal comma	2	25		64:63	27.26		−2.26
septimal semicomma	1	12.5		126:125	13.79		−1.29
unison	0	0		1:1	0.00		0.00

Moving from 12-EDO to 96-EDO allows the better approximation of a number of intervals, such as the minor third and major sixth.

== Scale diagram ==
=== Modes ===
96-EDO contains all of the 12-EDO modes. However, it contains better approximations to some intervals (such as the minor third).

== See also ==
- Varieties of equal temperament
