= Septimal meantone temperament =

In music, septimal meantone temperament, also called standard septimal meantone or simply septimal meantone, refers to the tempering of 7-limit musical intervals by a meantone temperament tuning in the range from fifths flattened by the amount of fifths for 12 equal temperament to those as flat as 19 equal temperament, with 31 equal temperament being a more or less optimal tuning for both the 5- and 7-limits.

== Choice of temperament ==
Meantone temperament produces a frequency ratio of approximately 5 by means of four fifths, so that the major third (for instance C–E) is obtained from two successive whole tones.

Septimal meantone produces the frequency ratio of 56 ( 7 × 2^{3} ) by ten fifths, so that the interval 7:4 is reached by five successive tones. Hence C–A♯, not C–B♭, represents a 7:4 interval in septimal meantone.

A♯+++ ≈ B♭
C	G	D	A+	E+	B+	F♯++	C♯++	G♯++	D♯++	A♯+++
C	≈G	≈D	≈A+	≈E+	≈B+	≈F♯++	≈C♯++	≈G♯++	≈D♯++	=B♭

There are several slightly adjusted meantone tunings very nearly equivalent to exact quarter comma meantone, which all have good renditions of harmonic seventh intervals, always through an augmented sixth of the chord's tonic note. They are exact quarter tone (pure major thirds), quarter tone modified for exact ^{Aug}6 = _{harm}7, and 31 tone equal temperament.

Temperament goal	Temperament name	Size of fifth	Audio example
pure 5:4 intervals	quarter-comma meantone	696.58 cents	
pure 7:4 intervals	modified quarter tone	696.88 cents	
uniform intervals in every key	31 equal temperament	696.77 cents	

31 equal temperament does excellently for both of the others: It has augmented sixths only 1.1 cent flat of a purely harmonic seventh, and its major third is only 1.2 cents sharper than a pure fifth harmonic; while the fifth is 5.2 cents flat from the third harmonic. The differences are so small that the distinction is mainly academic.

== Theoretical properties ==
Septimal meantone tempers out not only the syntonic comma of 81:80, but also the septimal semicomma of 126:125, and the septimal kleisma of 225:224 . Because the septimal semicomma is tempered out, a chord with intervals 6:5 – 6:5 – 6:5 – 7:6, spanning the octave, is a part of the septimal meantone tuning system. This chord might be called the septimal semicomma diminished seventh. Similarly, because the septimal kleisma is tempered out, a chord with intervals of size 5:4 – 5:4 – 9:7 spans the octave; this might be called the septimal kleisma augmented triad, and is likewise a characteristic feature of septimal meantone.

== Chords of septimal meantone ==
Septimal meantone of course has major and minor triads, and also diminished triads, which come in both an otonal, 5:6:7 form, as for instance C–E♭–F♯, and an inverted utonal form, as for instance C–D♯–F♯. As previously remarked, it has a septimal diminished seventh chord, which in various inversions can be C–E♭–G♭–B, C–E♭–G♭–A, C–E♭–F♯–A or C–D♯–F♯–A. It also has a septimal augmented triad, which in various inversions can be C–E–G♯, C–E–A♭ or C–F♭–A♭. It has both a dominant seventh chord, C–E–G–B♭, and an otonal tetrad, C–E–G–A♯; the latter is familiar in common practice harmony under the name German sixth. It likewise has utonal tetrads, C–E♭–G–B, which in the arrangement B–E♭–G–C becomes Wagner's Tristan chord. It has also the subminor triad, C–D♯–G, which is otonal, and the supermajor triad, C–F♭–G, which is utonal. These can be extended to subminor tetrads, C–D♯–G–A and supermajor tetrads C–F♭–G–B♭.

== 11-limit meantone ==
Septimal meantone can be extended to the 11-limit, but not uniquely. It is possible to take the interval of 11 by means of 18 fifths up and 7 octaves down, so that an 11:4 is made up of nine tones (e.g. C–E). The 11 is pure using this method if the fifth is of size 697.30 cents, very close to the fifth of 74 equal temperament. On the other hand, 13 meantone fourths up and two octaves down (e.g. C-G) will also work, and the 11 is pure using this method for a fifth of size 696.05 cents, close to the 696 cents of 50 equal temperament. The two methods are conflated for 31 equal temperament, where E and G are enharmonic.
