= 58 equal temperament =

Division of an octave

In music, 58 equal temperament (also called 58-ET or 58-EDO) divides the octave into 58 equal parts of approximately 20.69 cents each. It is notable as the simplest equal division of the octave to faithfully represent the 17-limit, and the first that distinguishes between all the elements of the 11-limit tonality diamond. The next-smallest equal temperament to do both these things is 72 equal temperament.

Compared to 72-EDO, which is also consistent in the 17-limit, 58-EDO's approximations of most intervals are not quite as good (although still workable). One obvious exception is the perfect fifth (slightly better in 58-EDO), and another is the tridecimal minor third (11:13), which is significantly better in 58-EDO than in 72-EDO. The two systems temper out different commas; 72-EDO tempers out the comma 169:168, thus equating the 14:13 and 13:12 intervals. On the other hand, 58-EDO tempers out 144:143 instead of 169:168, so 14:13 and 13:12 are left distinct, but 13:12 and 12:11 are equated.

58-EDO, unlike 72-EDO, is not a multiple of 12, so the only interval (up to octave equivalency) that it shares with 12-EDO is the 600-cent tritone (which functions as both 17:12 and 24:17). On the other hand, 58-EDO has fewer pitches than 72-EDO and is therefore simpler.

== History and use ==
The medieval Italian music theorist Marchetto da Padova proposed a system that is approximately 29-EDO, which is a subset of 58-EDO, in 1318.

== Interval size ==
interval name	size (steps)	size (cents)	just ratio	just (cents)	error (cents)
octave	58	1200	2:1	1200	0
perfect fifth	34	703.45	3:2	701.96	+1.49
greater septendecimal tritone	29	600	17:12	603.00	−3.00
lesser septendecimal tritone	29	600	24:17	597.00	+3.00
septimal tritone	28	579.31	7:5	582.51	−3.20
eleventh harmonic	27	558.62	11:8	551.32	+7.30
15:11 wide fourth	26	537.93	15:11	536.95	+0.98
perfect fourth	24	496.55	4:3	498.04	−1.49
septimal narrow fourth	23	475.86	21:16	470.78	+5.08
tridecimal major third	22	455.17	13:10	454.21	+0.96
septimal major third	21	434.48	9:7	435.08	−0.60
undecimal major third	20	413.79	14:11	417.51	−3.72
major third	19	393.10	5:4	386.31	+6.79
tridecimal neutral third	17	351.72	16:13	359.47	−7.75
undecimal neutral third	17	351.72	11:9	347.41	+4.31
minor third	15	310.34	6:5	315.64	−5.30
tridecimal minor third	14	289.66	13:11	289.21	+0.45
septimal minor third	13	268.97	7:6	266.87	+2.10
tridecimal semifourth	12	248.28	15:13	247.74	+0.54
septimal whole tone	11	227.59	8:7	231.17	−3.58
whole tone, major tone	10	206.90	9:8	203.91	+2.99
whole tone, minor tone	9	186.21	10:9	182.40	+3.81
greater undecimal neutral second	8	165.52	11:10	165.00	+0.52
lesser undecimal neutral second	7	144.83	12:11	150.64	−5.81
septimal diatonic semitone	6	124.14	15:14	119.44	+4.70
septendecimal semitone; 17th harmonic	5	103.45	17:16	104.96	−1.51
diatonic semitone	5	103.45	16:15	111.73	−8.28
septimal chromatic semitone	4	82.76	21:20	84.47	−1.71
chromatic semitone	3	62.07	25:24	70.67	−8.60
septimal third tone	3	62.07	28:27	62.96	−0.89
septimal quarter tone	2	41.38	36:35	48.77	−7.39
septimal diesis	2	41.38	49:48	35.70	+5.68
septimal comma	1	20.69	64:63	27.26	−6.57
syntonic comma	1	20.69	81:80	21.51	−0.82

== See also ==
- Harry Partch's 43-tone scale; 58-EDO is the smallest equal temperament that can reasonably approximate this scale
