= Numerary =

Numerary may refer to:

- Numerary, one of the types of membership of Opus Dei
- Numerary protonotary, a historical position in Roman Catholic Church
- Numerary nexus, in musical tuning
- Numerary system in naval flag signalling
