= Major and minor =

Musical concepts

In Western music, the adjectives major and minor may describe an interval, chord, scale, or key. A composition, movement, section, or phrase may also be referred to by its key, including whether that key is major or minor.

The words derive from Latin words meaning "large" and "small," and were originally applied to the intervals between notes, which may be larger or smaller depending on how many semitones (half-steps) they contain. Chords and scales are described as major or minor when they contain the corresponding intervals, usually major or minor thirds.

== Intervals ==
A major interval is one semitone larger than a minor interval. The words perfect, diminished, and augmented are also used to describe the quality of an interval. Only the intervals of a second, third, sixth, and seventh (and the compound intervals based on them) may be major or minor (or, rarely, diminished or augmented). Unisons, fourths, fifths, and octaves and their compound interval must be perfect (or, rarely, diminished or augmented).

== Scales and chords ==
Major and minor may also refer to scales and chords that contain a major third or a minor third, respectively.

A major scale is a scale in which the third scale degree (the mediant) is a major third above the tonic note. In a minor scale, the third degree is a minor third above the tonic.

Similarly, in a major triad or major seventh chord, the third is a major third above the chord's root. In a minor triad or minor seventh chord, the third is a minor third above the root.

== Keys ==
Circle of fifths showing major and minor keys

The hallmark that distinguishes major keys from minor is whether the third scale degree is major or minor. Major and minor keys are based on the corresponding scales, and the tonic triad of those keys consist of the corresponding chords; however, a major key can encompass minor chords based on other roots, and vice versa.

As musicologist Roger Kamien explains, "the crucial difference is that in the minor scale there is only a half step between '2nd and 3rd note' and between '5th and 6th note' as compared to the major scales where the difference between '3rd and 4th note' and between '7th and 8th note' is [a half step]." This alteration in the third degree "greatly changes" the mood of the music, and "music based on minor scales tends to" be considered to "sound serious or melancholic," at least to contemporary Western ears.

Minor keys are sometimes said to have a more interesting, possibly darker sound than plain major scales. Contrariwise, the minor key has also been considered less justifiable than the major, with Paul Hindemith calling it a "clouding" of major, and Moritz Hauptmann calling it a "falsehood of the major". Harry Partch considered both to have equal standing, with the major corresponding to "an immutable faculty of the human ear", and the minor to "the immutable faculty of ratios, which in turn represent an immutable faculty of the human ear."

Changes of mode, which involve the alteration of the third, and mode mixture are often analyzed as minor changes unless structurally supported because the root and overall key and tonality remain unchanged. This is in contrast with, for instance, transposition. Transposition is done by moving all intervals up or down a certain constant interval, and does change the key but not the mode, which requires the alteration of intervals. The use of triads only available in the minor mode, such as the use of A♭-major in C major, is relatively decorative chromaticism, considered to add color and weaken the sense of key without entirely destroying or losing it.

== Intonation and tuning ==
Musical tuning of intervals is expressed by the ratio between the pitches' frequencies. Simple fractions can sound more harmonious than complex fractions; for instance, an octave is a simple 2:1 ratio and a fifth is the relatively simple 3:2 ratio. The table below gives frequency ratios that are mathematically exact for just intonation, which meantone temperaments seek to approximate.

Note name	C	D	E	F	G	A	B	C′
frequency ratio (just int.)	1:1	9:8	5:4	4:3	3:2	5:3	15:8	2:1
Interval name (from C)	perfect unison	major second	major third	perfect fourth	perfect fifth	major sixth	major seventh	perfect octave
Interval size (in cents)	0	203.9	386.3	498.0	702.0	884.4	1088.3	1200

In just intonation, a minor chord is often (but not exclusively) tuned in the frequency ratio 10:12:15. In 12 tone equal temperament (12 TET, at present the most common tuning system in the West) a minor chord has 3 semitones between the root and third, 4 between the third and fifth, and 7 between the root and fifth.

In 12 TET, the perfect fifth (700 cents) is only about two cents narrower than the justly tuned perfect fifth (3:2, or 702.0 cents), but the minor third (300 cents) is noticeably (about 16 cents) narrower than the just minor third (6:5, or 315.6 cents). Moreover, the minor third (300 cents) more closely approximates the 19-limit (Limit) minor third (19:16 or 297.5 cents, the nineteenth harmonic) with only about a 2 cent error.

A.J. Ellis proposed that the conflict between mathematicians and physicists on one hand and practicing musicians on the other regarding the supposed inferiority of the minor chord and scale to the major may be explained due to physicists' comparison of just minor and just major triads, in which case minor comes out the loser, versus the musicians' comparison of the equal tempered triads, in which case minor comes out the winner, since the 12 TET major third is about 14 cents sharp from the just major third (5:4, or 386.3 cents), but only about 4 cents narrower than the 19 limit major third (24:19, or 404.4 cents); while the 12 TET minor third closely approximates the 19:16 minor third which many find pleasing. (Note: In the 16th through 18th centuries, prior to 12 TET, the minor third in meantone temperament was 310 cents and much rougher than the 300 cent 12 TET minor third.)

== Advanced theory ==
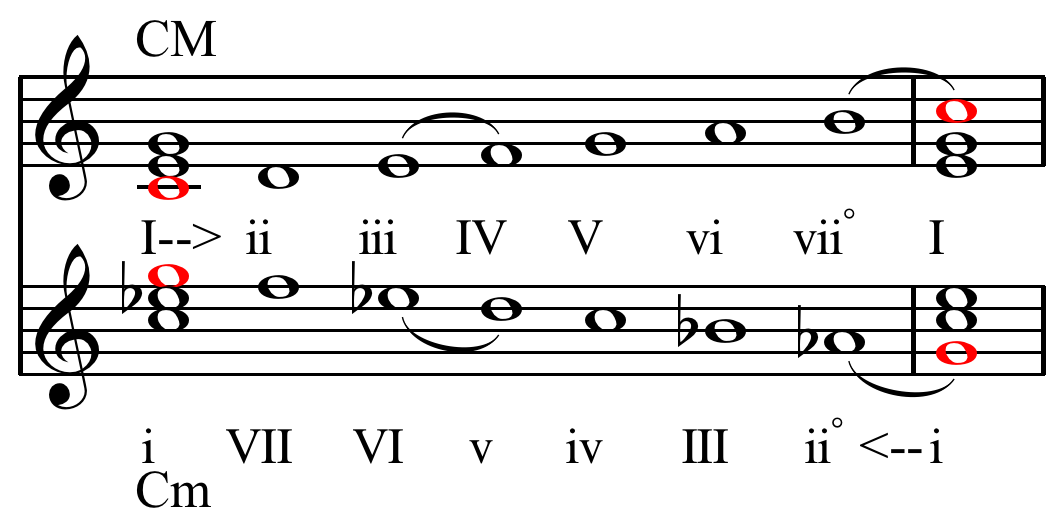
Minor as upside down major

In the Neo-Riemannian theory, the minor mode is considered the inverse of the major mode, an upside down major scale based on (theoretical) undertones rather than (actual) overtones (harmonics) (See also: Utonality).

The root of the minor triad is thus considered the top of the fifth, which, in the United States, is called the fifth. So in C minor, the tonic is actually G and the leading tone is A♭ (a half step), rather than, in major, the root being C and the leading tone B (a half step). Also, since all chords are analyzed as having a tonic, subdominant, or dominant function, with, for instance, in C, A minor being considered the tonic parallel (tP) (US relative), the use of minor mode root chord progressions in major such as A♭-major–B♭-major–C-major is analyzed as sP–dP–T, the minor subdominant parallel (see: parallel chord), the minor dominant parallel, and the major tonic.

== See also ==
- Gypsy scale
- List of major/minor compositions
- Music written in all major or minor keys
- Otonality and utonality
