= Ogdoad =

Ogdoad may refer to:

- Ogdoad (Egyptian)
- Ogdoad (Gnosticism)

== See also ==
- Ogdoades, a work of history by Guillaume du Bellay
- Tonality diamond
