= Semicomma =

Small musical interval

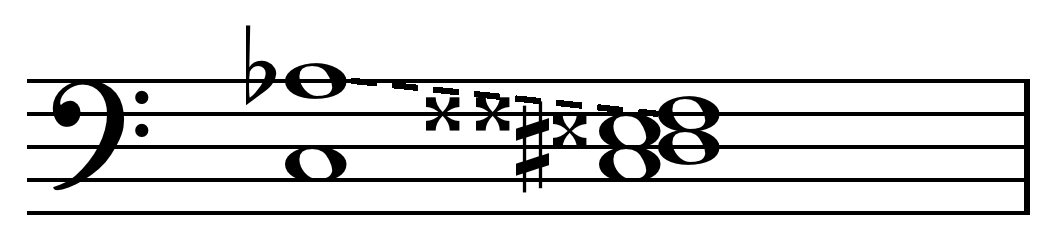
Semicomma on C.

The semicomma, also Fokker's comma (after 31-TET pioneer Adriaan Fokker), is type of small musical interval, or comma, in microtonal music equivalent to 2109375:2097152, or 3^{3}×5^{7} : 2^{21}. This is a ratio of approximately 1:1.0058283805847168, or about 10.06 cents. It is derived from the difference in pitch between three 75:64 just augmented seconds and one 8:5 just minor sixth begun on the same root ((3 × 274.58) − (1 × 813.69) = 823.74 − 813.69 = 10.05 cents). It can also be viewed as the amount by which three tritaves exceed seven minor sixths.

== See also ==
- Septimal kleisma
- Septimal semicomma
