= Otonality and utonality =

Music theory concept

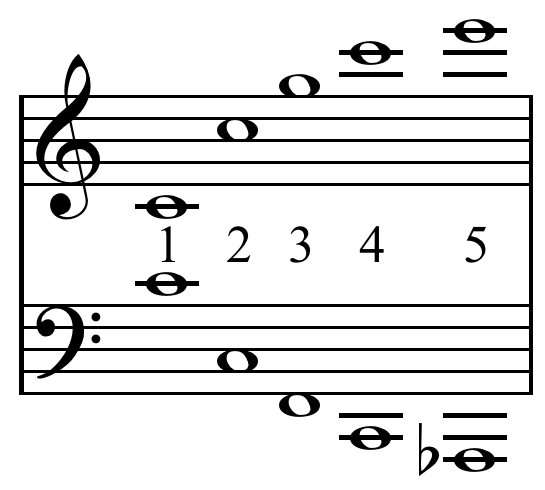
5-limit otonality and utonality: overtone and "undertone" series, partials 1-5 numbered,,, and.

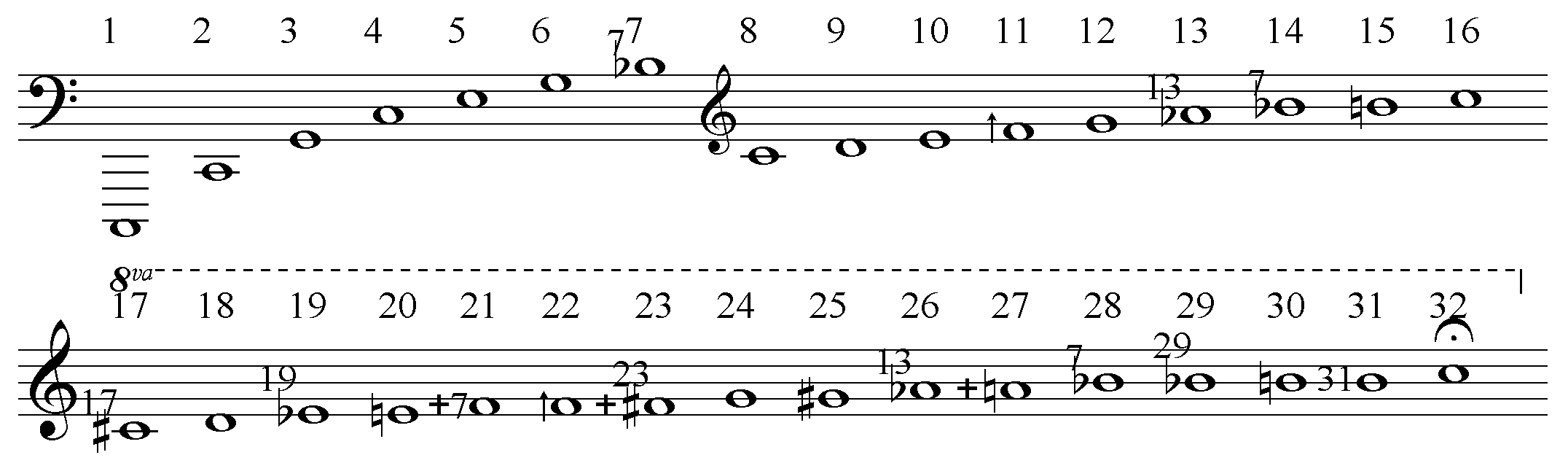
31-limit otonality

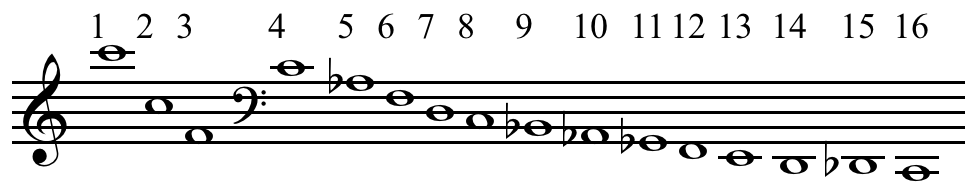
13-limit utonality

Otonality and utonality are terms introduced by Harry Partch to describe chords whose pitch classes are the harmonics or subharmonics of a given fixed tone (identity), respectively. For example: 1/1, 2/1, 3/1,... or 1/1, 1/2, 1/3,....

An Otonality is that set of pitches generated by the numerical factors (...identities)...over a numerical constant (...numerary nexus) in the denominator. Conversely, a Utonality is the inversion of an Otonality, a set of pitches with a numerical constant in the numerator over the numerical factors...in the denominator.

== Definition ==
G(=1/1), A(=9/8), B(=5/4), B(=11/8), D(=3/2), F(=7/4)
Otonality on G = lower line of the tonality diamond bottom left to top right.
G(=1/1), F(=16/9), E(=8/5), D(=16/11), C(=4/3), A(=8/7)
Utonality under G = lower line of the tonality diamond bottom right to top left.

A Utonality is a ...chord that is the inversion of an Otonality: it is formed by building the same interval sequence as that of an Otonality downward from the root of the chord, rather than upward. The analogy, in this case, is not to the harmonic series but to the subharmonic, or undertone series.

An otonality is a collection of pitches which can be expressed in ratios, expressing their relationship to the fixed tone, that have equal denominators and consecutive numerators. For example, 1/1, 5/4, and 3/2 (just major chord) form an otonality because they can be written as 4/4, 5/4, 6/4. This in turn can be written as an extended ratio 4:5:6. Every otonality is therefore composed of members of a harmonic series. Similarly, the ratios of a utonality share the same numerator and have consecutive denominators. 7/4, 7/5, 7/6, and 1/1 (7/7) form a utonality, sometimes written as 1/4:5:6:7, or as 7/7:6:5:4. Every utonality is therefore composed of members of a subharmonic series. This term is used extensively by Harry Partch in Genesis of a Music.

An otonality corresponds to an arithmetic series of frequencies (such as 110 Hz, 220 Hz, 330 Hz, 440 Hz, etc.). Brass instruments naturally produce otonalities, and indeed otonalities are inherent in the harmonics of a single fundamental tone. Tuvan Khoomei singers produce otonalities with their vocal tracts.

Utonality is the opposite, corresponding to a subharmonic series of frequencies, or an arithmetic series of wavelengths (the inverse of frequency), such as 1 foot, 2 feet, 3 feet, 4 feet, etc. The arithmetical proportion "may be considered as a demonstration of utonality ('minor tonality')."

If otonality and utonality are defined broadly, every just intonation chord is both an otonality and a utonality. For example, the minor triad in root position is made up of the 10th, 12th and 15th harmonics, and 10/10, 12/10 and 15/10 meets the definition of otonal. A better, narrower definition requires that the harmonic (or subharmonic) series members be adjacent. Thus 4:5:6 is an otonality, but 10:12:15 is not. (Alternate voicings of 4:5:6, such as 5:6:8, 3:4:5:6, etc. would presumably also be otonalities.) Under this definition, only a few chord types qualify as otonalities or utonalities. The only otonality triads are the major triad 4:5:6 and the diminished triad 5:6:7. The only such tetrad is the dominant seventh tetrad 4:5:6:7.

Microtonalists have extended the concept of otonal and utonal to apply to all just intonation chords. A chord is otonal if its odd limit increases on being melodically inverted, utonal if its odd limit decreases, and ambitonal if its odd limit is unchanged. Melodic inversion is not inversion in the usual sense, in which C–E–G becomes E–G–C or G–C–E. Instead, C–E–G is turned upside down to become C–A♭–F. A chord's odd limit is the largest of the odd limits of each of the numbers in the chord's extended ratio. For example, the major triad in close position is 4:5:6. These three numbers have odd limits of 1, 5 and 3 respectively. The largest of the three is 5, thus the chord has an odd limit of 5. Its melodic inverse 10:12:15 has an odd limit of 15, which is greater, therefore the major triad is otonal. A chord's odd limit is independent of its voicing, so alternate voicings such as 5:6:8, 3:4:5:6, etc. are also otonal.

All otonalities are otonal, but not all otonal chords are otonalities. Likewise, all utonalities are a subset of utonal chords.

The major ninth chord 8:10:12:15:18 is also otonal. Examples of ambitonal chords are the major sixth chord (12:15:18:20) and the major seventh chord (8:10:12:15). Ambitonal chords often can be reasonably interpreted as either major or minor. For example, CM^{6}, in certain contexts or voicings, can be interpreted as Am^{7}.

Partch coined the term "Monophony" (not to be confused with monophony) to describe a system of just intervals deriving from a single starting pitch.

== Relationship to standard Western music theory ==
Partch said that his 1931 coinage of "otonality" and "utonality" was "hastened" by having read Henry Cowell's discussion of undertones in New Musical Resources (1930).

Starting from the symmetrical chords, otonal chords flatten one note, while utonal chords sharpen one note.

The 5-limit otonality is simply a just major chord, and the 5-limit utonality is a just minor chord. Thus otonality and utonality can be viewed as extensions of major and minor tonality respectively. However, whereas standard music theory views a minor chord as being built up from the root with a minor third and a perfect fifth, a utonality is viewed as descending from what's normally considered the "fifth" of the chord, so the correspondence is not perfect. This corresponds with the dualistic theory of Hugo Riemann:

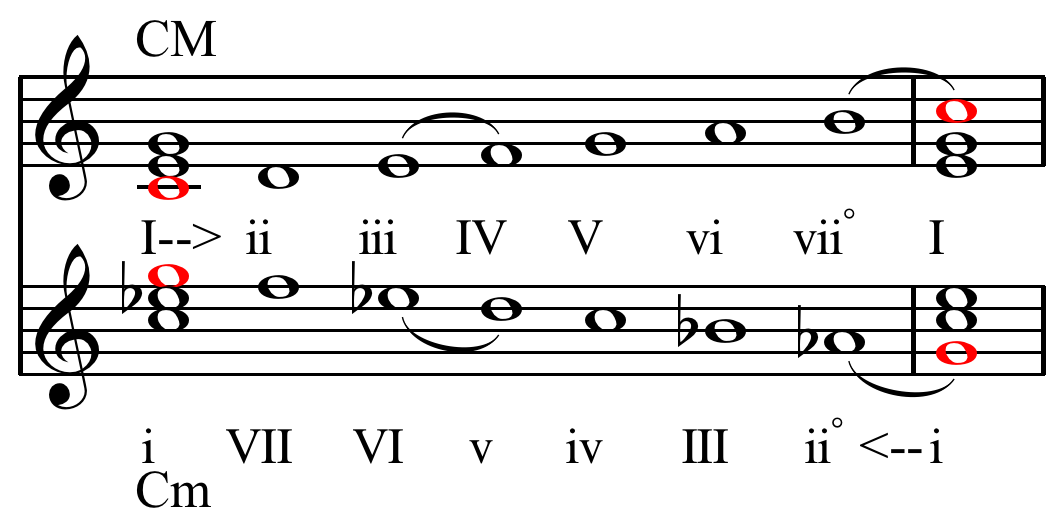
Minor as upside down major.

In the era of meantone temperament, augmented sixth chords of the kind known as the German sixth (or the English sixth, depending on how it resolves) were close in tuning and sound to the 7-limit otonality, called the tetrad. This chord might be, for example, A♭-C-E♭-G♭[F♯]. Standing alone, it has something of the sound of a dominant seventh, but considerably less dissonant. It has also been suggested that the Tristan chord, for example, F-B-D♯-G♯ can be considered a utonality, or 7-limit utonal tetrad, which it closely approximates if the tuning is meantone, though presumably less well in the tuning of a Wagnerian orchestra.

Whereas 5-limit chords associate otonal with major and utonal with minor, 7-limit chords that don't use 5 as a prime factor reverse this association. For example, 6:7:9 is otonal but minor, and 14:18:21 is utonal but major.

== Consonance ==
Though Partch presents otonality and utonality as being equal and symmetric concepts, when played on most physical instruments an otonality sounds much more consonant than a similar utonality, due to the presence of the missing fundamental phenomenon. In an otonality, all of the notes are elements of the same harmonic series, so they tend to partially activate the presence of a "virtual" fundamental as though they were harmonics of a single complex pitch. Utonal chords, while containing the same dyads and roughness as otonal chords, do not tend to activate this phenomenon as strongly. There are more details in Partch's work.

== Use ==
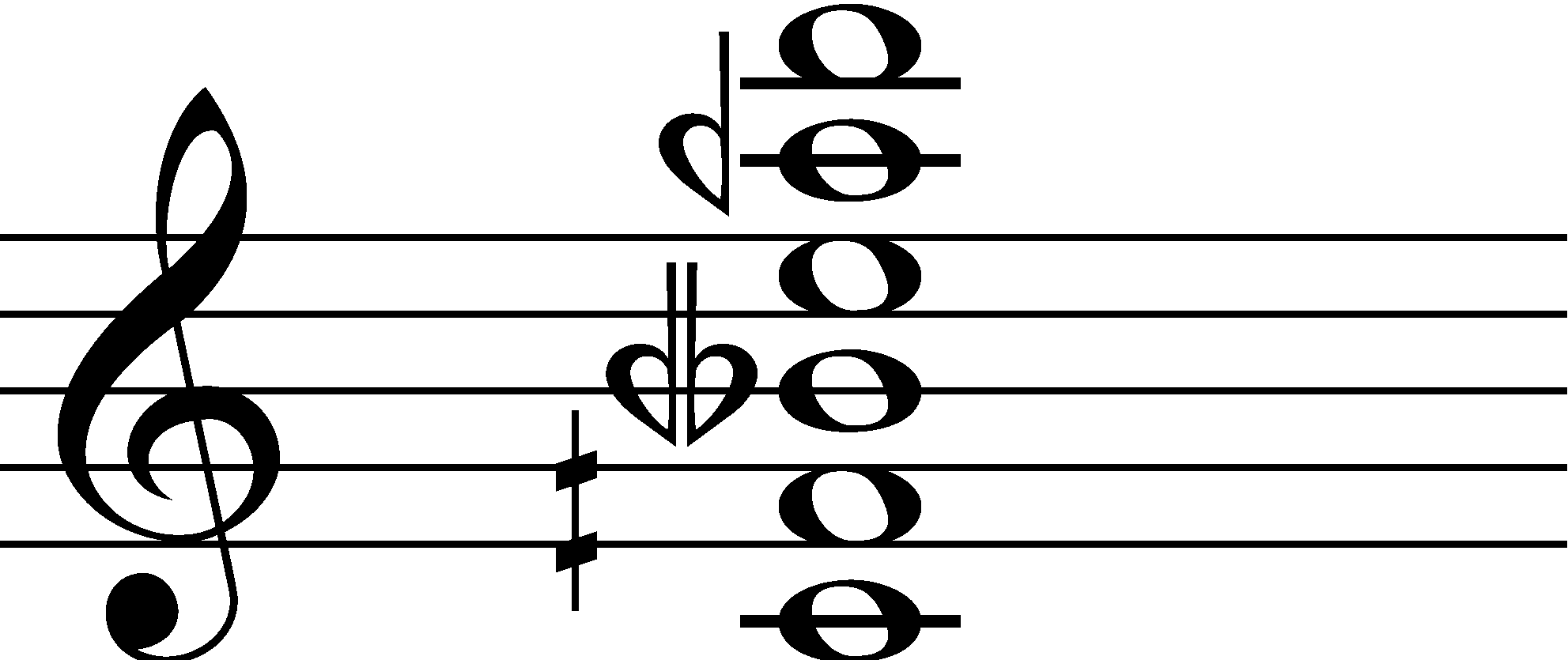
Mystic chord as the 1st, 11th, 7th, 5th, 13th, and 9th harmonics (quarter tone approximation)

Partch used otonal and utonal chords in his music. Ben Johnston often uses the otonal as an expanded tonic chord: 4:5:6:7:11:13 (C:E:G:B♭:F↑:A♭) and bases the opening of the third movement of his String Quartet No. 10 on this thirteen-limit Otonality on C. The mystic chord has been theorized as being derived from harmonics 8 through 14 without 12: 8:9:10:11:13:14 (C:D:E:F↑:A♭:B♭), and as harmonics 7 through 13: 7:8:9:10:(11:)12:13 (C:D-:E:F♯:(G↑-:)A:B♭-); both otonal. Yuri Landman published a microtonal diagram that compares series of otonal and utonal scales with 12TET and the harmonic series. He applies this system for just transposition with a set of electric microtonal kotos.

== See also ==
- Scale of harmonics
- Tonality flux
- Tonality diamond
