= Septimal semicomma =

In music, the septimal semicomma, a seven-limit semicomma, is the ratio 126/125 and is equal to approximately 13.79 cents. It is also called the small septimal comma and the starling comma after its use in starling temperament.

Factored into primes it is: $2*3^2*5^{-3}*7$

Or as simple just intervals: $(6/5)^3*(7/6)*(2/1)^{-1}$

Thus it is the difference between three minor thirds of 6/5 plus a septimal minor third of 7/6 and an octave (2/1). This comma is important to certain tuning systems, such as septimal meantone temperament.

A diminished seventh chord consisting of three minor thirds and a subminor third making up an octave is possible in such systems. This characteristic feature of these tuning systems is known as the septimal semicomma diminished seventh chord.

== In equal temperament ==
It is tempered out in 19 equal temperament and 31 equal temperament, but not in 22 equal temperament, 34 equal temperament, 41 equal temperament, or 53 equal temperament.

== See also ==
- Comma (music)
- Semicomma
- 7-limit
- Septimal meantone temperament
- Septimal minor third
- Diminished seventh chord
- Equal temperament
