= 19 equal temperament =

Musical tuning system with 19 pitches per octave

Figure 1: 19-TET on the syntonic temperament's tuning continuum at P5= 694.737 cents

In music, 19 equal temperament, called 19 TET, 19 EDO ("Equal Division of the Octave"), 19-ED2 ("Equal Division of 2:1) or 19 ET, is the tempered scale derived by dividing the octave into 19 equal steps (equal frequency ratios). Each step represents a frequency ratio of ^{19}√2, or 63.16 cents.

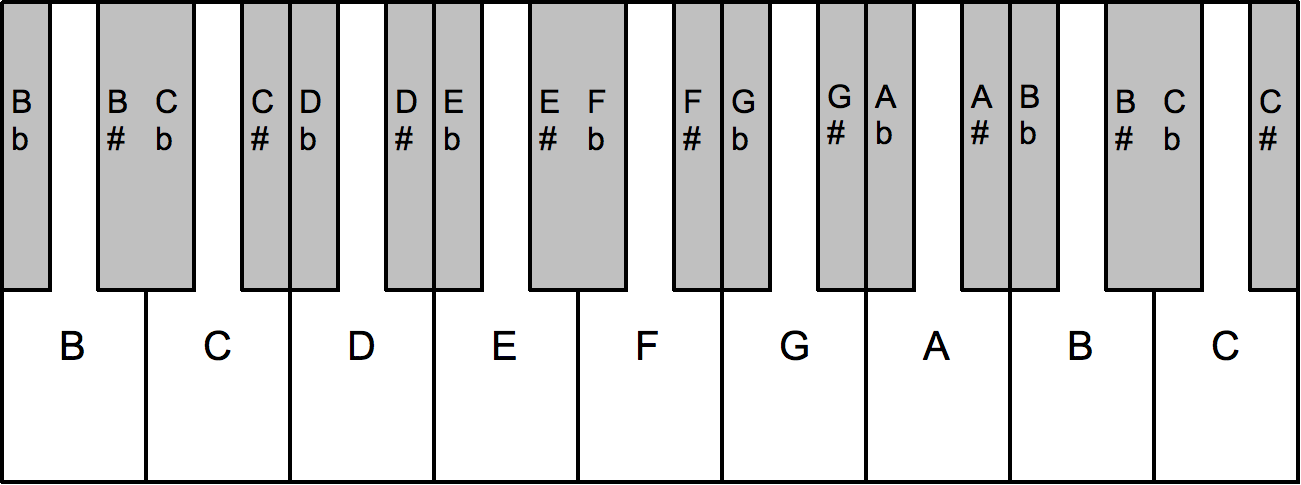
19 equal temperament keyboard

The fact that traditional western music maps unambiguously onto this scale (unless it presupposes 12-EDO enharmonic equivalences) makes it easier to perform such music in this tuning than in many other tunings.

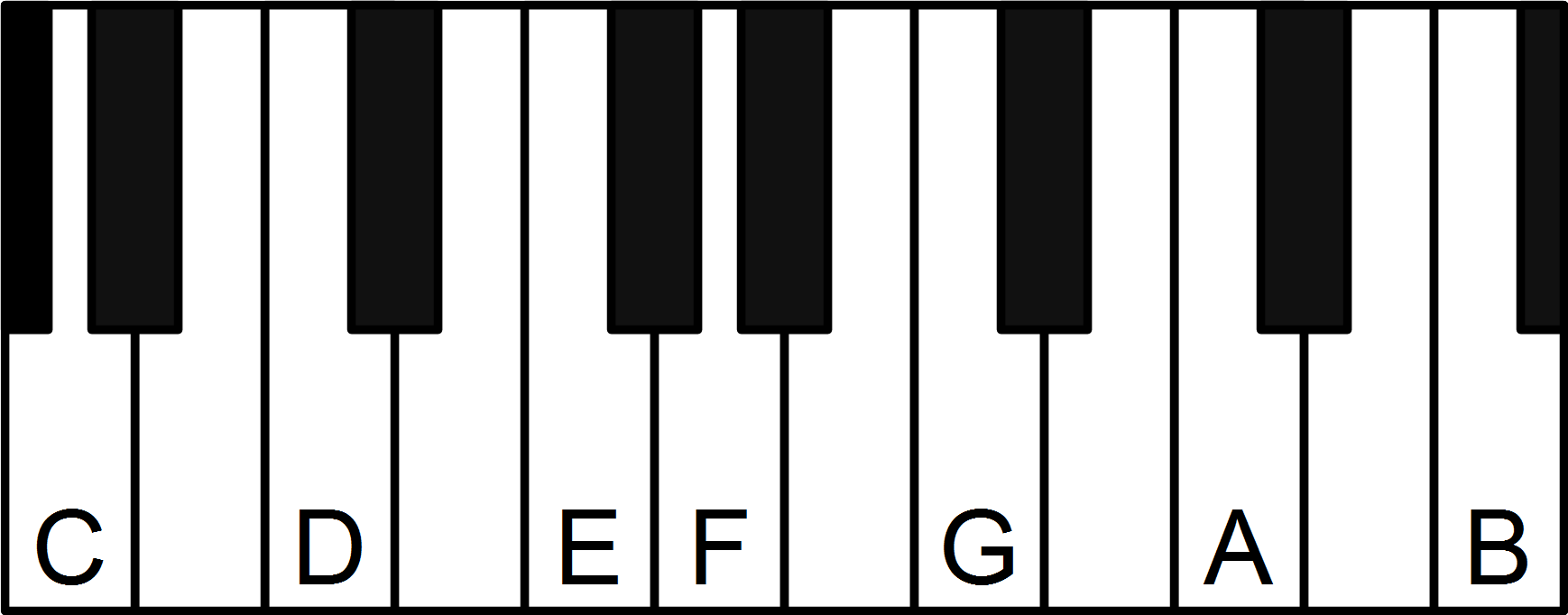
Joseph Yasser's 19 equal temperament keyboard layout

19 EDO is the tuning of the syntonic temperament in which the tempered perfect fifth is equal to 694.737 cents, as shown in Figure 1 (look for the label "19 TET"). On an isomorphic keyboard, the fingering of music composed in 19 EDO is precisely the same as it is in any other syntonic tuning (such as 12 EDO), so long as the notes are "spelled properly" – that is, with no assumption that the sharp below matches the flat immediately above it (enharmonicity).

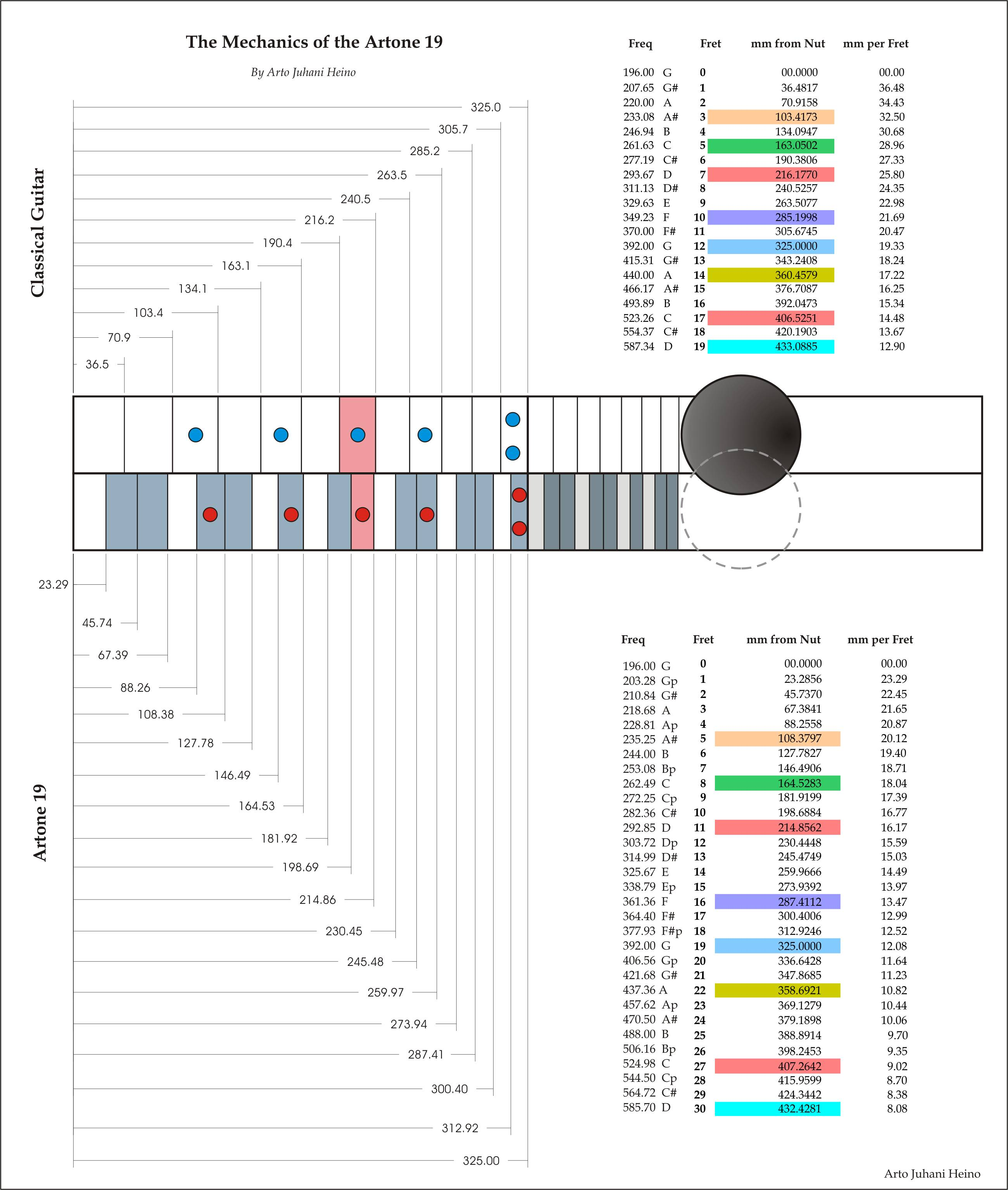
The comparison between a standard 12 tone classical guitar and a 19 tone guitar design. This is the preliminary data that Arto Juhani Heino used to develop the "Artone 19" guitar design. The measurements are in millimeters.

== History and use ==
Division of the octave into 19 equal-width steps arose naturally out of Renaissance music theory. Four just intonated minor thirds (i.e. 6/5 to the power of four) is 62.565 cents sharper than an octave; this "greater" diesis is almost exactly a nineteenth of an octave. Likewise, five chromatic semitones in 19 equal temperament is an almost perfect minor third.

Interest in such a tuning system goes back to the 16th century, when composer Guillaume Costeley used it in his chanson Seigneur Dieu ta pitié of 1558. Costeley understood and desired the circulating aspect of this tuning. In 1577, music theorist Francisco de Salinas discussed 1 / 3 comma meantone, in which the tempered perfect fifth is 694.786 cents. Salinas proposed tuning nineteen tones to the octave to this fifth, which falls within one cent of closing. The fifth of 19 EDO is 694.737 cents, which is less than a twentieth of a cent narrower, imperceptible and less than tuning error, so Salinas' suggestion is, for purposes relating to human hearing, functionally identical to 19 EDO.

In the 19th century, mathematician and music theorist Wesley Woolhouse proposed it as a more practical alternative to meantone temperaments he regarded as better, such as 50 EDO.

The composer Joel Mandelbaum wrote on the properties of the 19 EDO tuning and advocated for its use in his Ph.D. thesis: Mandelbaum argued that it is the only viable system with a number of divisions between 12 and 22, and furthermore, that the next smallest number of divisions resulting in a significant improvement in approximating just intervals is 31 tet. Mandelbaum and Joseph Yasser have written music with 19 EDO. Easley Blackwood stated that 19 EDO makes possible "a substantial enrichment of the tonal repertoire". Jim Aikin advocates for 19 equal temperament.

== Notation ==
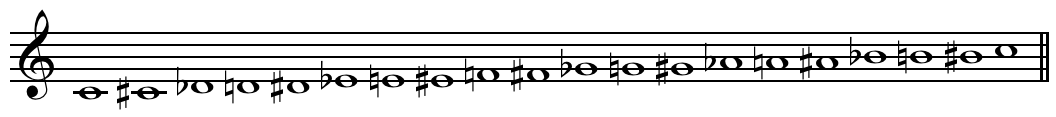
Usual pitch notation, promoted by Easley Blackwood and Wesley Woolhouse, for 19 equal temperament: Intervals are notated similarly to the 12 tet intervals that approximate them. Aside from double sharps or double flats, only the note pairs E♯ & F♭ and B♯ & C♭ are enharmonic equivalents (modern sense).

Just intonation intervals approximated in 19 EDO

Notes in 19-EDO can be represented with the letter notation or staff notation of 12-EDO; however, enharmonic notes in 12-EDO are different pitches in 19-EDO (e.g. C♯ and D♭ are different pitches in 19-EDO though they sound the same in 12-EDO). Additionally in 19-EDO, B♯ is the note between B and C, enharmonic with C♭; E♯ is the note between E and F, enharmonic with F♭. Asides from those two cases, there are no other enharmonic equivalent notes in 19-EDO without the use of double sharps or double flats.

This article uses the notation described above.

== Interval size ==
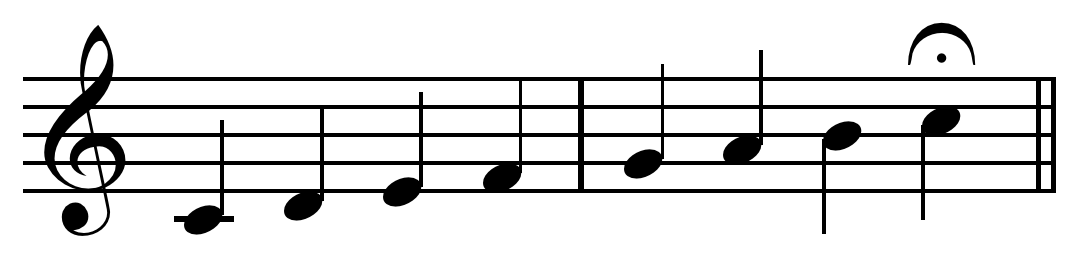
, contrast with diatonic scale in 12 EDO, contrast with just diatonic scale

Here are the sizes of some common intervals and comparison with the ratios arising in the harmonic series; the difference column measures in cents the distance from an exact fit to these ratios.

For reference, the difference from the perfect fifth in the widely used 12 TET is 1.955 cents flat, the difference from the major third is 13.686 cents sharp, the minor third is 15.643 cents flat, and the (lost) harmonic minor seventh is 31.174 cents sharp.

Step (cents)	63	63	63	63	63	63	63	63	63	63	63	63	63	63	63	63	63	63	63	
Note name	A	A♯	B♭	B	B♯ C♭	C	C♯	D♭	D	D♯	E♭	E	E♯ F♭	F	F♯	G♭	G	G♯	A♭	A
Interval (cents)	0	63	126	189	253	316	379	442	505	568	632	695	758	821	884	947	1011	1074	1137	1200

Interval name	Size (steps)	Size (cents)	Midi	Just ratio	Just (cents)	Midi	Error (cents)
Octave	19	1200		2:1	1200		0
Septimal major seventh	18	1136.84		27:14	1137.04		−0.20
Diminished octave	18	1136.84		48:25	1129.33		+7.51
Major seventh	17	1073.68		15:8	1088.27		−14.58
Minor seventh	16	1010.53		9:5	1017.60		−7.07
Harmonic minor seventh	15	947.37		7:4	968.83		−21.46
Septimal major sixth	15	947.37		12:7	933.13		+14.24
Major sixth	14	884.21		5:3	884.36		−0.15
Minor sixth	13	821.05		8:5	813.69		+7.37
Augmented fifth	12	757.89		25:16	772.63		−14.73
Septimal minor sixth	12	757.89		14:9	764.92		−7.02
Perfect fifth	11	694.74		3:2	701.96		−7.22
Greater tridecimal tritone	10	631.58		13:9	636.62		−5.04
Greater septimal tritone, diminished fifth	10	631.58		10:7	617.49		+14.09
Lesser septimal tritone, augmented fourth	9	568.42		7:5	582.51		−14.09
Lesser tridecimal tritone	9	568.42		18:13	563.38		+5.04
Perfect fourth	8	505.26		4:3	498.04		+7.22
Augmented third	7	442.11		125:96	456.99		−14.88
Tridecimal major third	7	442.11		13:10	454.12		−10.22
Septimal major third	7	442.11		9:7	435.08		+7.03
Major third	6	378.95		5:4	386.31		−7.36
Inverted 13th harmonic	6	378.95		16:13	359.47		+19.48
Minor third	5	315.79		6:5	315.64		+0.15
Septimal minor third	4	252.63		7:6	266.87		−14.24
Tridecimal 5 / 4 tone	4	252.63		15:13	247.74		+4.89
Septimal whole tone	4	252.63		8:7	231.17		+21.46
Whole tone, major tone	3	189.47		9:8	203.91		−14.44
Whole tone, minor tone	3	189.47		10:9	182.40		+7.07
Greater tridecimal 2 / 3 -tone	2	126.32		13:12	138.57		−12.26
Lesser tridecimal 2 / 3 -tone	2	126.32		14:13	128.30		−1.98
Septimal diatonic semitone	2	126.32		15:14	119.44		+6.88
Diatonic semitone, just	2	126.32		16:15	111.73		+14.59
Septimal chromatic semitone	1	63.16		21:20	84.46		−21.31
Chromatic semitone, just	1	63.16		25:24	70.67		−7.51
Septimal third-tone	1	63.16		28:27	62.96		+0.20

A possible variant of 19-ED2 is 93-ED30, i.e. the division of 30:1 in 93 equal steps, corresponding to a stretching of the octave by just under 3¢, which improves the approximation of most natural ratios.

== Scale diagram ==
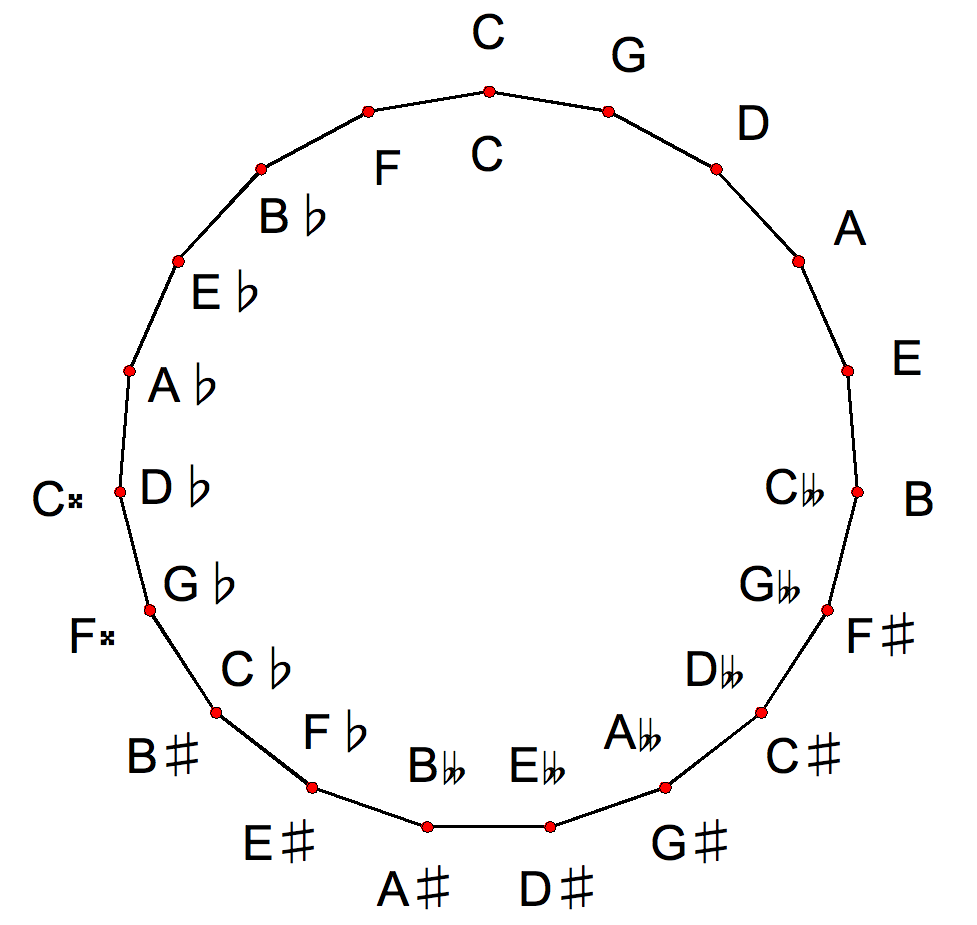
Circle of fifths in 19 tone equal temperament

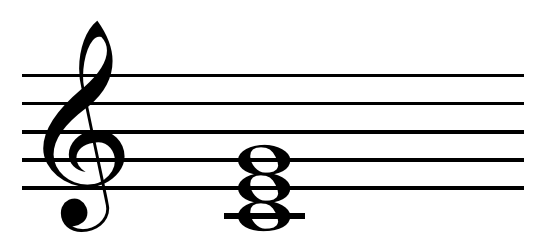
Major chord on C in 19 equal temperament: All notes within 8 cents of just intonation (rather than 14 for 12 equal temperament).,, or

Because 19 is a prime number, repeating any fixed interval in this tuning system cycles through all possible notes; just as one may cycle through 12-EDO on the circle of fifths, since a fifth is 7 semitones, and number 7 is coprime to 12.

key signature	Locrian root	Phrygian root	Aeolian (minor) root	Dorian root	Mixolydian root	Ionian (major) root	Lydian root
9 sharps	C𝄪 (D♭)	F𝄪 (G♭)	B♯ (C♭)	E♯	A♯	D♯	G♯
8 sharps	F𝄪 (G♭)	B♯ (C♭)	E♯	A♯	D♯	G♯	C♯
7 sharps	B♯ (C♭)	E♯	A♯	D♯	G♯	C♯	F♯
6 sharps	E♯	A♯	D♯	G♯	C♯	F♯	B
5 sharps	A♯	D♯	G♯	C♯	F♯	B	E
4 sharps	D♯	G♯	C♯	F♯	B	E	A
3 sharps	G♯	C♯	F♯	B	E	A	D
2 sharps	C♯	F♯	B	E	A	D	G
1 sharp	F♯	B	E	A	D	G	C
0	B	E	A	D	G	C	F
1 flat	E	A	D	G	C	F	B♭
2 flats	A	D	G	C	F	B♭	E♭
3 flats	D	G	C	F	B♭	E♭	A♭
4 flats	G	C	F	B♭	E♭	A♭	D
5 flats	C	F	B♭	E♭	A♭	D♭	G♭
6 flats	F	B♭	E♭	A♭	D♭	G♭	C♭
7 flats	B♭	E♭	A♭	D♭	G♭	C♭	F♭ (E♯)
8 flats	E♭	A♭	D♭	G♭	C♭	F♭ (E♯)	B𝄫 (A♯)
9 flats	A♭	D♭	G♭	C♭	F♭ (E♯)	B𝄫 (A♯)	E𝄫 (D♯)

== See also ==
- Archicembalo, instrument with a double keyboard layout consisting of a 19 tone system close to 19tet in pitch with an additional 12 tone keyboard that is tuned approximately a quartertone in between the white keys of the 19 tone keyboard.
- Beta scale
- Elaine Walker (composer)
- Meantone temperament
- Musical temperament
- 23 tone equal temperament
- 31 tone equal temperament
