= Tetrad (music) =

Chord made up of four notes

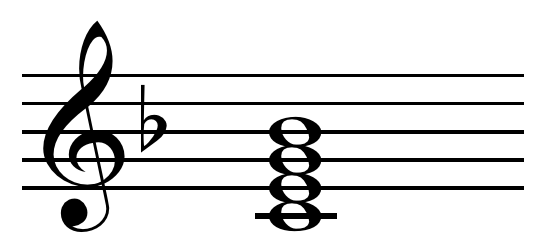
Dominant seventh chord on C: C^{7}.

A tetrad is a set of four notes in music theory. When these four notes form a tertian chord they are more specifically called a seventh chord, after the diatonic interval from the root of the chord to its fourth note (in root position close voicing). Four-note chords are often formed of intervals other than thirds in 20th- and 21st-century music, however, where they are more generally referred to as tetrads. Musicologist Allen Forte in his The Structure of Atonal Music never uses the term "tetrad", but occasionally employs the word tetrachord to mean any collection of four pitch classes. In 20th-century music theory, such sets of four pitch classes are usually called "tetrachords".

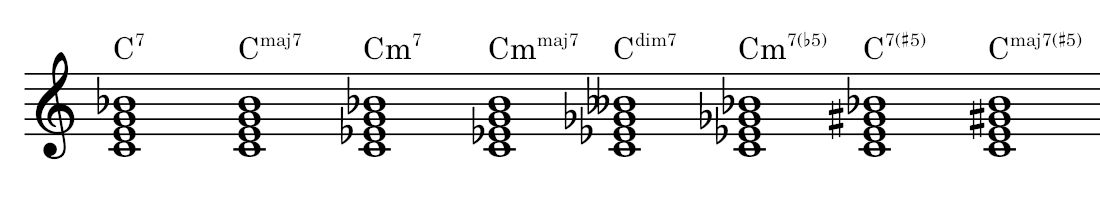
types of tetrachords (tetrads)
