= 23 equal temperament =

Tuning system with no consonant intervals

In music, 23 equal temperament, called 23-TET, 23-EDO ("Equal Division of the Octave"), or 23-ET, is the tempered scale derived by dividing the octave into 23 equal steps (equal frequency ratios). Each step represents a frequency ratio of ^{23}√2, or 52.174 cents. This system is the largest EDO that has an error of at least 20 cents for the 3rd (3:2), 5th (5:4), 7th (7:4), and 11th (11:8) harmonics. The lack of approximation to simple intervals makes the scale notable among those seeking to break free from conventional harmony rules.

== History and use ==
23-EDO was advocated by ethnomusicologist Erich von Hornbostel in the 1920s, as the result of "a cycle of 'blown' (compressed) fifths" of about 678 cents that may have resulted from overblowing a bamboo pipe. Today, tens of pieces have been composed in this system.

== Notation ==
There are two ways to notate the 23 tone system with the traditional letter names and system of sharps and flats, called melodic notation and harmonic notation.

Harmonic notation preserves harmonic structures and interval arithmetic, but sharp and flat have reversed meanings. Because it preserves harmonic structures, 12 EDO music can be reinterpreted as 23 EDO harmonic notation, so it is also called conversion notation.

An example of these harmonic structures is the circle of fifths below, shown in 12 EDO, harmonic notation, and melodic notation.

Circle of fifths in 12 EDO			Circle of fifths in 23 EDO harmonic notation				Circle of fifths in 23 EDO melodic notation			
Sharp side	Enhar- monic?	Flat side	Sharp side	Enhar- monic	Flat side	Enhar- monic	Flat side	Enhar- monic	Sharp side	Enhar- monic
C	=	D	C		D	E	C		D	E
G	=	A	G		A	B	G		A	B
D	=	E	D		E		D		E	
A	=	B	A		B		A		B	
E	=	F^{♭}	E		F^{♭}		E		F^{♯}	
B	=	C^{♭}	B		C^{♭}		B		C^{♯}	
F^{♯}	=	G^{♭}	F^{♯}		G^{♭}		F^{♭}		G^{♯}	
C^{♯}	=	D^{♭}	C^{♯}		D^{♭}		C^{♭}		D^{♯}	
G^{♯}	=	A^{♭}	G^{♯}		A^{♭}		G^{♭}		A^{♯}	
D^{♯}	=	E^{♭}	D^{♯}		E^{♭}		D^{♭}		E^{♯}	
A^{♯}	=	B^{♭}	A^{♯}		B^{♭}		A^{♭}		B^{♯}	
E^{♯}	=	F	E^{♯}	D	F		E^{♭}	D	F	
B^{♯}	=	C	B^{♯}	A	C		B^{♭}	A	C	

Melodic notation preserves the meaning of sharp and flat, but harmonic structures and interval arithmetic learned from 12 EDO mostly become invalid.

== Interval size ==
Interval name / comments	Size (steps)	Size (cents)	MIDI
Octave	23	1200	
	21	1095.65	
Major sixth (3 cents sharp of 5/3)	17	886.96	
"Blown fifth" interval (24 cents flat of a 3/2 perfect fifth)	13	678.26	
	11	573.91	
Fourth (octave inversion of "blown fifth")	10	521.74	
	9	469.57	
	8	417.39	
Major third (21 cents flat of 5/4)	7	365.22	
Minor third (3 cents flat of 6/5)	6	313.04	
	5	260.87	
Large step appearing between B-C or E-F	4	208.70	
"Whole step" between A-B or C-D (actually smaller than the step from B-C)	3	156.52	
	2	104.35	
Single step - this is the interval by which ♯ and ♭ modify pitches	1	52.17	

== Scale diagram ==
Step (cents)	52	52	52	52	52	52	52	52	52	52	52	52	52	52	52	52	52	52	52	52	52	52	52	
Melodic Notation note name	A	A♯	B♭	B	B♯	B C	C♭	C	C♯	D♭	D	D♯	E♭	E	E♯	E F	F♭	F	F♯	G♭	G	G♯	A♭	A
Harmonic Notation note name	A	A♭	B♯	B	B♭	B C	C♯	C	C♭	D♯	D	D♭	E♯	E	E♭	E F	F♯	F	F♭	G♯	G	G♭	A♯	A
Interval (cents)	0	52	104	157	209	261	313	365	417	470	522	574	626	678	730	783	835	887	939	991	1043	1096	1148	1200

== See also ==
- Musical temperament
- Equal temperament
