= Limit (music) =

Numerical limit on the factors used in a musical tuning system

The first 16 harmonics, with frequencies and log frequencies (not drawn to scale).

A limit is the highest prime or odd factor used in the ratios of any musical tuning system. The term was devised by Harry Partch.

== History ==
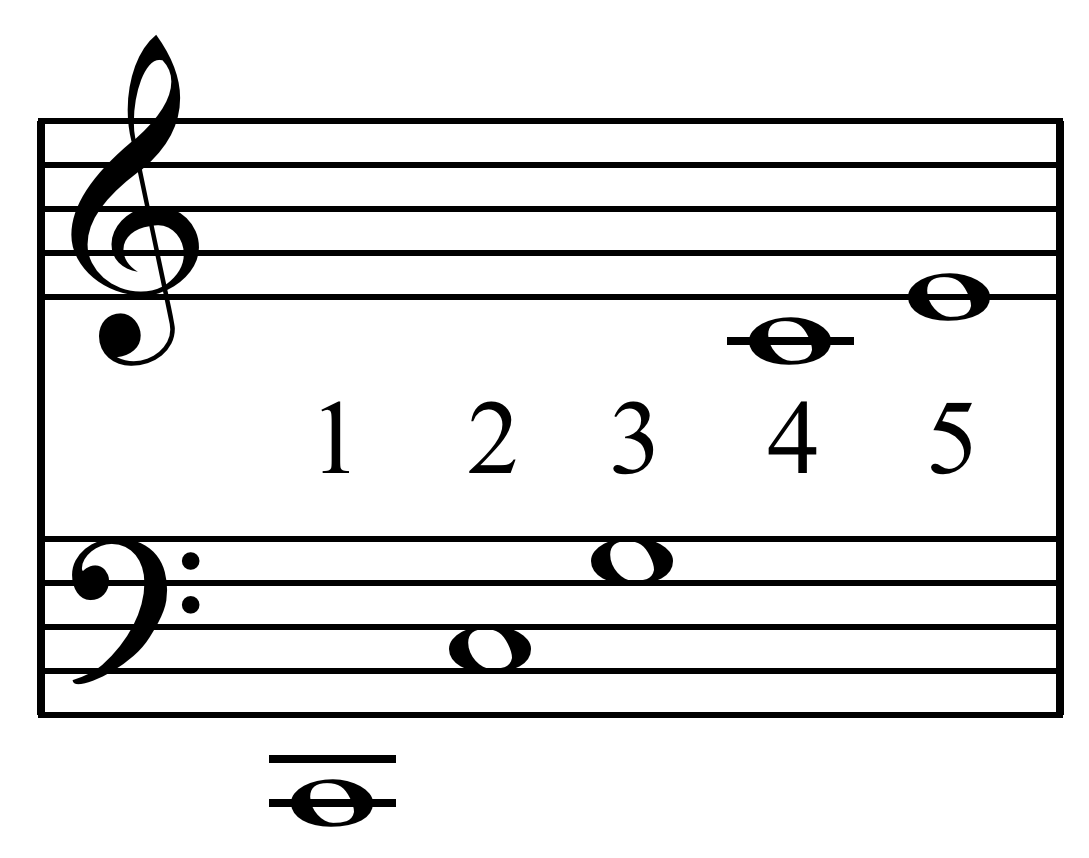
Overtone series, partials 1-5 numbered.

The idea of a limit to the prime numbers that could be used to generate intervals originated with Harry Partch. The essential limit of equal temperament is 5, which allows for all the basic triads. By increasing the limit, more complex chords could be created. In his music, Partch capped the prime factor at 11. His goal was to expand tonality.

In medieval music, only chords made of octaves and perfect fifths (involving relationships among the first three harmonics) were considered consonant. In the West, triadic harmony arose (contenance angloise) around the time of the Renaissance, and triads quickly became the fundamental building blocks of Western music. The major and minor thirds of these triads invoke relationships among the first five harmonics.

Around the turn of the 20th century, tetrads debuted as fundamental building blocks in African-American music. In conventional music theory pedagogy, these seventh chords are usually explained as chains of major and minor thirds. However, they can also be explained as coming directly from harmonics greater than 5. For example, the dominant seventh chord in 12-ET approximates 4:5:6:7 (albeit very poorly), while the major seventh chord approximates 8:10:12:15.

== Odd-limit and prime-limit ==
In just intonation, intervals between pitches are drawn from the rational numbers. Since Partch, two distinct formulations of the limit concept have emerged: odd limit and prime limit. Odd limit and prime limit n do not include the same intervals even when n is an odd prime.

=== Odd limit ===
For a positive odd number n, the n-odd-limit contains all rational numbers such that the largest odd number that divides either the numerator or denominator is not greater than n.

In Genesis of a Music, Harry Partch considered just intonation rationals according to the size of their numerators and denominators, modulo octaves. Since octaves correspond to factors of 2, the complexity of any interval may be measured simply by the largest odd factor in its ratio.

=== Identity ===
An identity is each of the odd numbers below and including the (odd) limit in a tuning. For example, the identities included in 5-limit tuning are 1, 3, and 5. Each odd number represents a new pitch in the harmonic series and may thus be considered an identity:

C  C  G  C  E  G  B  C  D  E  F  G  ...
1  2  3  4  5  6  7  8  9  10 11 12 ...

According to Partch: "The number 9, though not a prime, is nevertheless an identity in music, simply because it is an odd number." Partch defines "identity" as "one of the correlatives, 'major' or 'minor', in a tonality; one of the odd-number ingredients, one or several or all of which act as a pole of tonality".

Odentity and udentity are short for over-identity and under-identity, respectively. According to music software producer Tonalsoft: "An udentity is an identity of an utonality".

=== Prime limit ===
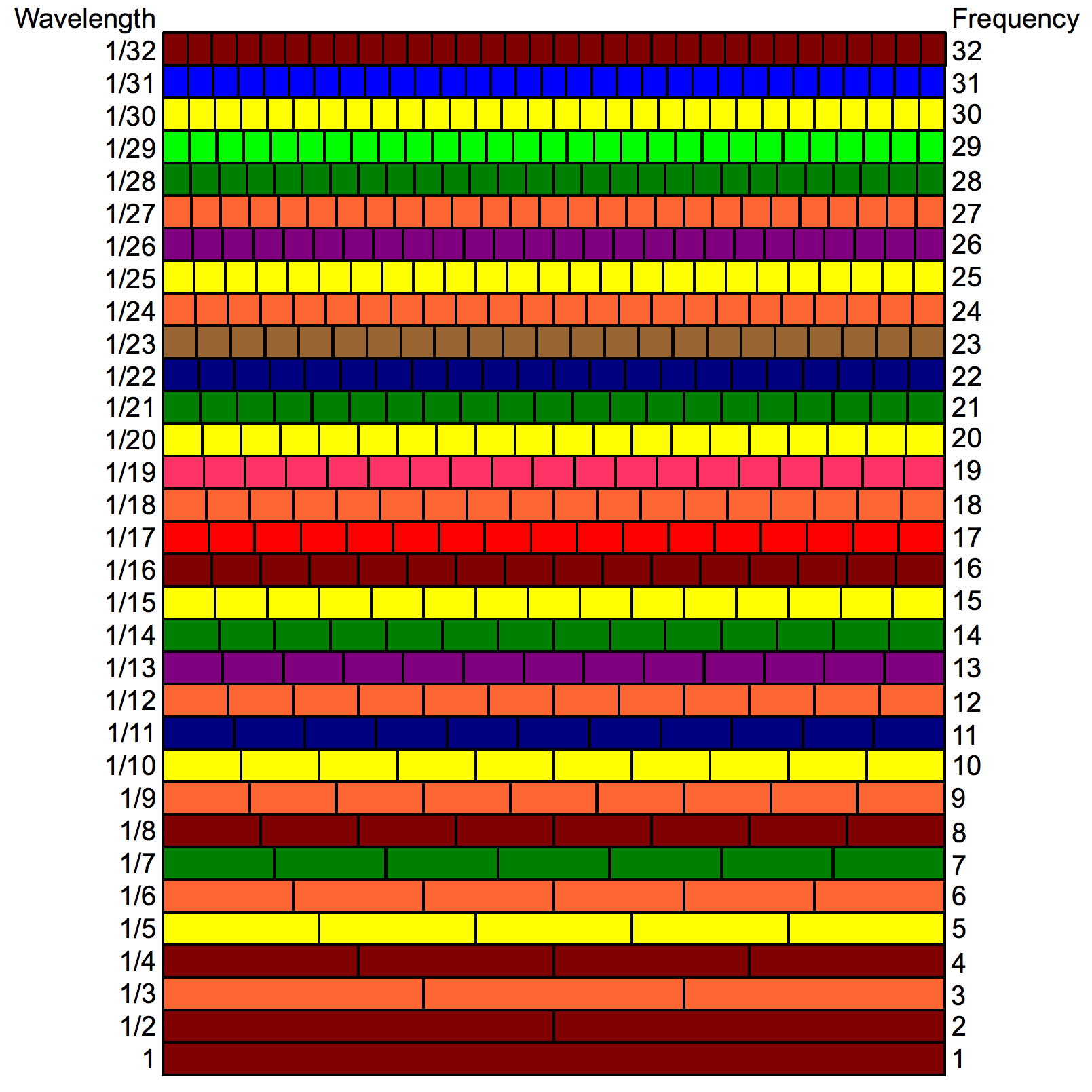
First 32 harmonics, with the harmonics unique to each limit sharing the same color.

For a prime number n, the n-prime-limit contains all rational numbers that can be factored using primes no greater than n. In other words, it is the set of rationals with numerator and denominator both n-smooth.

p-Limit Tuning. Given a prime number p, the subset of $\mathbb{Q}^+$ consisting of those rational numbers x whose prime factorization has the form $x=p_1^{\alpha_1} p_2^{\alpha_2}... p_r^{\alpha_r}$ with $p_1,...,p_r \le p$ forms a subgroup of ($\mathbb{Q}^+,\cdot$). ... We say that a scale or system of tuning uses p-limit tuning if all interval ratios between pitches lie in this subgroup.

In the late 1970s, a new genre of music began to take shape on the West coast of the United States, known as the American gamelan school. Inspired by Indonesian gamelan, musicians in California and elsewhere began to build their own gamelan instruments, often tuning them in just intonation. The central figure of this movement was the American composer Lou Harrison. Unlike Partch, who often took scales directly from the harmonic series, the composers of the American Gamelan movement tended to draw scales from the just intonation lattice, in a manner like that used to construct Fokker periodicity blocks. Such scales often contain ratios with very large numbers, that are nevertheless related by simple intervals to other notes in the scale.

Prime-limit tuning and intervals are often referred to using the term for the numeral system based on the limit. For example, 7-limit tuning and intervals are called septimal, 11-limit is called undecimal, and so on.

== Examples ==
ratio	interval	odd-limit	prime-limit	audio
3/2	perfect fifth	3	3	
4/3	perfect fourth	3	3	
5/4	major third	5	5	
5/2	major tenth	5	5	
5/3	major sixth	5	5	
7/5	lesser septimal tritone	7	7	
10/7	greater septimal tritone	7	7	
9/8	major second	9	3	
27/16	Pythagorean major sixth	27	3	
81/64	ditone	81	3	
243/128	Pythagorean major seventh	243	3	

== Beyond just intonation ==
In musical temperament, the simple ratios of just intonation are mapped to nearby irrational approximations. This operation, if successful, does not change the relative harmonic complexity of the different intervals, but it can complicate the use of the harmonic limit concept. Since some chords (such as the diminished seventh chord in 12-ET) have several valid tunings in just intonation, their harmonic limit may be ambiguous.

== See also ==
- 3-limit (Pythagorean) tuning
- Five-limit tuning
- 7-limit tuning
- Numerary nexus
- Otonality and Utonality
- Tonality diamond
- Tonality flux
