= Tonality diamond =

Set of musical pitches

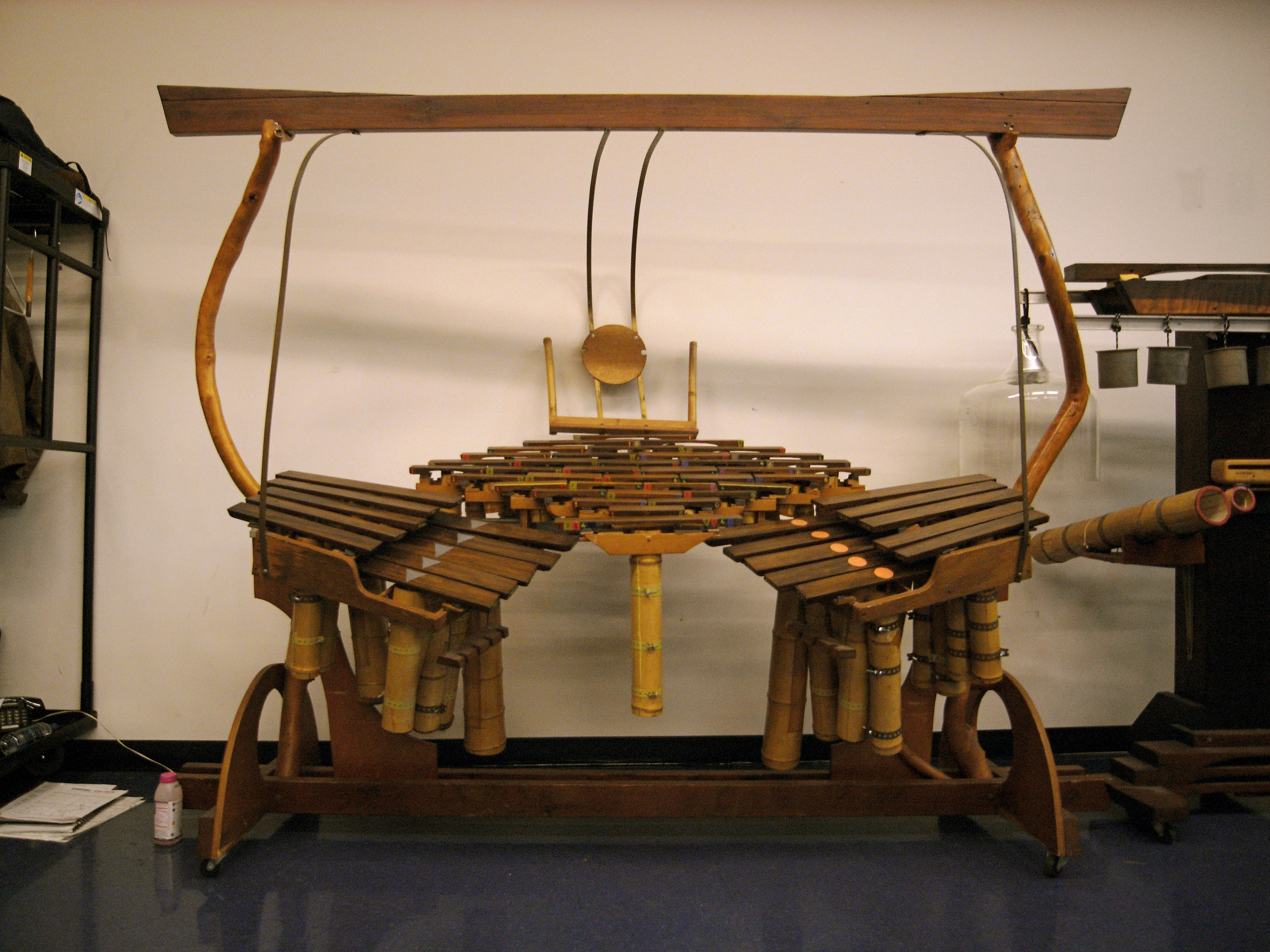
The Quadrangularis Reversum, an instrument constructed by Harry Partch based on the 11-limit tonality diamond

In music theory and tuning, a tonality diamond is a diamond-shaped diagram of ratios comprising overlapping tonalities in which the major tonalities orient along one diagonal and the minor tonalities along the other.

An n-limit tonality diamond ("limit" here is in the sense of odd limit, not prime limit) is an arrangement in diamond-shape of the set of rational numbers r, $1 \le r < 2$, such that the odd part of both the numerator and the denominator of r, when reduced to lowest terms, is less than or equal to the fixed odd number n. Equivalently, the diamond may be considered as a set of pitch classes, where a pitch class is an equivalence class of pitches under octave equivalence. The tonality diamond is often regarded as comprising the set of consonances of the n-limit. Although originally invented by Max Friedrich Meyer, the tonality diamond is now most associated with Harry Partch ("Many theorists of just intonation consider the tonality diamond Partch's greatest contribution to microtonal theory.").

== The diamond arrangement ==
Partch arranged the elements of the tonality diamond in the shape of a rhombus subdivided into (n+1)^{2}/4 smaller rhombuses, where n is the odd limit (the highest odd number used in the ratios defining the pitch classes of the tonality diamond). In the rhombuses along the upper left edge of the diamond are placed ratios whose overnumbers (numerators) are the odd numbers from 1 to n. The undernumber (denominator) of each is the minimum integer power of 2 such that $1 \le r < 2$, where $r$ is the value or quotient of the ratio. For example, 1/1 3/2 5/4. The ratios are then sorted in ascending order (1/1 5/4 3/2) within those rhombuses. In the rhombuses along the lower left edge are placed the corresponding reciprocal ratios with the undernumbers containing the odd numbers 1 to n and the overnumbers taking the powers of 2 such that $1 \le r < 2$. For example, 1/1 8/5 4/3. In all other rhombuses are placed the products of the diagonally upper-left and lower-left ratios also satisfying $1 \le r < 2$. That defines all the elements of the tonality diamond, with some repetition. Diagonals sloping in one direction form Otonalities and diagonals in the other direction form Utonalities. One of Partch's instruments, the diamond marimba, is arranged according to the tonality diamond.

=== Numerary nexus ===
A numerary nexus is an identity shared by two or more interval ratios in their numerator or denominator, with different identities in the other. For example, in the following Otonality, the denominator is always 1, thus 1 is the numerary nexus:

$\begin{array}{cccccc} \frac{1}{1} &\frac{2}{1} &\frac{3}{1} &\frac{4}{1} &\frac{5}{1} &\mathrm{etc.} \\ & &(\frac{3}{2}) & &(\frac{5}{4}) \end{array}$

In the following Utonality, the numerator is always 1 and the numerary nexus is thus also 1:

$\begin{array}{cccccc} \frac{1}{1} &\frac{1}{2} &\frac{1}{3} &\frac{1}{4} &\frac{1}{5} &\mathrm{etc.} \\ & &(\frac{4}{3}) & &(\frac{8}{5}) \end{array}$

Any identity can be used as a numerary nexus to form an otonality or utonality. For example, in a tonality diamond, such as Harry Partch's 11-limit diamond, each ratio of a right slanting row shares a numerator and each ratio of a left slanting row shares an denominator. Each ratio of the upper left row has 7 as a denominator, while each ratio of the upper right row has 7 (or 14) as a numerator.

=== 5-limit ===
		3/2
	5/4		6/5
1/1		1/1		1/1
	8/5		5/3
		4/3

		{{#parsoidfragment:12}}3/2
	{{#parsoidfragment:14}}5/4		{{#parsoidfragment:16}}6/5
{{#parsoidfragment:18}}1/1		1/1		1/1
	{{#parsoidfragment:22}}8/5		{{#parsoidfragment:24}}5/3
		{{#parsoidfragment:26}}4/3

This diamond contains three identities (1, 3, 5).

=== 7-limit ===
			7/4
		3/2		7/5
	5/4		6/5		7/6
1/1		1/1		1/1		1/1
	8/5		5/3		12/7
		4/3		10/7
			8/7

This diamond contains four identities (1, 3, 5, 7).

=== 11-limit ===
Tonal basis of Harry Partch's tuning system: 11-limit tonality diamond

This diamond contains six identities (1, 3, 5, 7, 9, 11). Harry Partch used the 11-limit tonality diamond, but flipped it 90 degrees.

=== 15-limit ===
15/8
7/4	5/3
13/8	14/9	3/2
3/2	13/9	7/5	15/11
11/8	4/3	13/10	14/11	5/4
5/4	11/9	6/5	13/11	7/6	15/13
9/8	10/9	11/10	12/11	13/12	14/13	15/14
1/1	1/1	1/1	1/1	1/1	1/1	1/1	1/1
16/9	9/5	20/11	11/6	24/13	13/7	28/15
8/5	18/11	5/3	22/13	12/7	26/15
16/11	3/2	20/13	11/7	8/5
4/3	18/13	10/7	22/15
16/13	9/7	4/3
8/7	6/5
16/15

This diamond contains eight identities (1, 3, 5, 7, 9, 11, 13, 15).

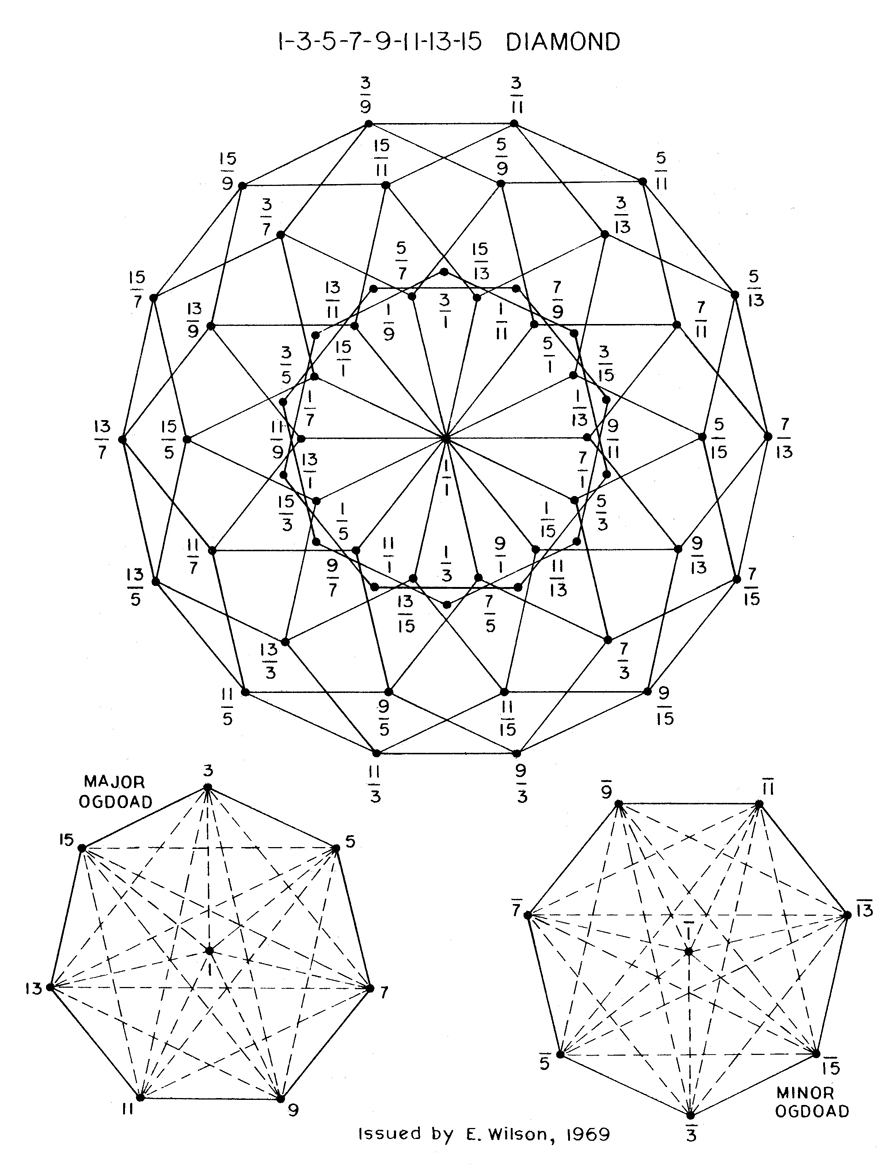
A lattice showing a mapping of the 15 limit diamond.

== Geometry of the tonality diamond ==
The five- and seven-limit tonality diamonds exhibit a highly regular geometry within the modulatory space, meaning all non-unison elements of the diamond are only one unit from the unison. The five-limit diamond then becomes a regular hexagon surrounding the unison, and the seven-limit diamond a cuboctahedron surrounding the unison.. Further examples of lattices of diamonds ranging from the triadic to the ogdoadic diamond have been realised by Erv Wilson where each interval is given its own unique direction.

== Properties of the tonality diamond ==
Three properties of the tonality diamond and the ratios contained:

1. All ratios between neighboring ratios are superparticular ratios, those with a difference of 1 between numerator and denominator.
2. Ratios with relatively lower numbers have more space between them than ratios with higher numbers.
3. The system, including the ratios between ratios, is symmetrical within the octave when measured in cents not in ratios.

For example:

5-limit tonality diamond, ordered least to greatest
Ratio	1/1	6/5	5/4	4/3	3/2	8/5	5/3	2/1
Cents	0	315.64	386.31	498.04	701.96	813.69	884.36	1200
Width		315.64	70.67	111.73	203.91	111.73	70.67	315.64

1. The ratio between 6/5 and 5/4 (and 8/5 and 5/3) is 25/24.
2. The ratios with relatively low numbers 4/3 and 3/2 are 203.91 cents apart, while the ratios with relatively high numbers 6/5 and 5/4 are 70.67 cents apart.
3. The ratio between the lowest and 2nd lowest and the highest and 2nd highest ratios are the same, and so on.

== Size of the tonality diamond ==
If φ(n) is Euler's totient function, which gives the number of positive integers less than n and relatively prime to n, that is, it counts the integers less than n which share no common factor with n, and if d(n) denotes the size of the n-limit tonality diamond, we have the formula

$$d(n) = \sum_{m<n \ odd} \phi(m).$$

From this we can conclude that the rate of growth of the tonality diamond is asymptotically equal to $\frac{2}{\pi^2} n^2$. The first few values are the important ones, and the fact that the size of the diamond grows as the square of the size of the odd limit tells us that it becomes large fairly quickly. There are seven members to the 5-limit diamond, 13 to the 7-limit diamond, 19 to the 9-limit diamond, 29 to the 11-limit diamond, 41 to the 13-limit diamond, and 49 to the 15-limit diamond; these suffice for most purposes.

== Translation to string length ratios ==
Yuri Landman published an otonality and utonality diagram that clarifies the relationship of Partch's tonality diamonds to the harmonic series and string lengths (as Partch also used in his Kitharas) and Landman's Moodswinger instrument.

In Partch's ratios, the over number corresponds to the number of equal divisions of a vibrating string, and the under number corresponds to which division the string length is shortened to. For example, 5/4 is derived from dividing the string into 5 equal parts and shortening the length to the 4th part from the bottom. In Landman's diagram, those numbers are inverted, changing the frequency ratios into string length ratios.

== See also ==
- Lattice (music)
- Tonality flux
