= Septimal chromatic semitone =

Interval 21:20, about 84.47 cents

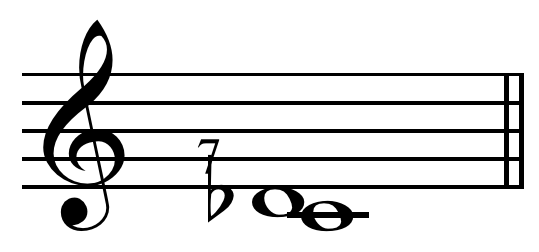
Septimal chromatic semitone on C.

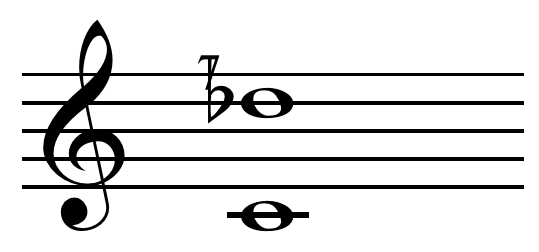
Septimal chromatic semitone + octave.

In music, a septimal chromatic semitone or minor semitone is the interval 21:20. It is about 84.47 cents. The septimal chromatic semitone may be derived from the harmonic series as the interval between the twentieth and twenty-first harmonics.

The septimal chromatic semitone equals a just chromatic semitone (25:24) plus a septimal semicomma (126:125).

When added to the 15:14 semitone, the 21:20 semitone and 28:27 semitone produce the 9:8 tone (major tone) and 10:9 tone (minor tone), respectively.
