= Well temperament =

Musical tuning system

In Western music theory, a well temperament (also good temperament, circular or circulating temperament) is a type of tempered tuning used for keyboard instruments of the seventeenth and eighteenth centuries. The term is modeled on the German word wohltemperiert. This word also appears in the title of J. S. Bach's famous composition "Das wohltemperierte Klavier", The Well-Tempered Clavier.

== Origins ==
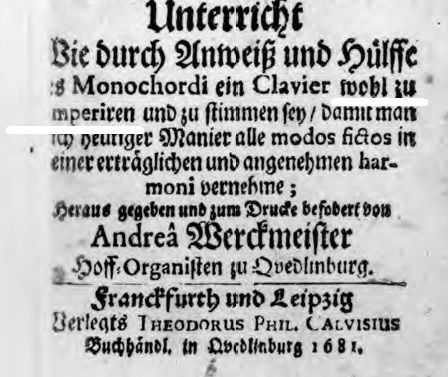
Cover of Orgelprobe (1681)

As used in the 17th century, the term "well tempered" meant that the twelve notes per octave of the standard keyboard were tuned in such a way that it was possible to play music in all major or minor keys that were commonly in use, without sounding perceptibly out of tune.

One of the first attestations of the concept of "well tempered" is found in a treatise in German by the music theorist Andreas Werckmeister. In the subtitle of his Orgelprobe, from 1681, he writes:

Unterricht, Wie durch Anweiß und Hülffe des Monochordi ein Clavier wohl zu temperiren und zu stimmen sei, damit man nach heutiger Manier alle modos fictos in einer erträglichen und angenehmen harmoni vernehme.

The words wohl and temperieren were subsequently combined into Wohltemperiert. A modern definition of "well temperament", from Herbert Kelletat, is given below:

Wohltemperierung heißt mathematisch-akustische und praktisch-musikalischen Einrichtung von Tonmaterial innerhalb der zwölfstufigen Oktavskala zum einwandfreien Gebrauch in allen Tonarten auf der Grundlage des natürlich-harmonischen Systems mit Bestreben möglichster Reinerhaltung der diatonische Intervalle. Sie tritt auf als proportionsgebundene, sparsam temperierende Lockerung und Dehnung des mitteltönigen Systems, als ungleichschwebende Semitonik und als gleichschwebende Temperatur.	Well temperament means a mathematical-acoustic and musical-practical organisation of the tone system within the twelve steps of an octave, with the goal of impeccable performance in all tonalities, based on the natural-harmonic tone system [i.e., extended just intonation], while striving to keep the diatonic intervals as pure as possible. This temperament acts, while tied to given pitch ratios, as a thriftily tempered smoothing and extension of the meantone, as unequally beating half tones and as equally beating [i.e., equal] temperament.

In most tuning systems used before 1700, one or more intervals on the twelve-note keyboard were so far from any pure interval that they were unusable in harmony and were called "wolf intervals". Until about 1650 the most common keyboard temperament was quarter-comma meantone, in which the fifths were narrowed so as to maximize the number of pure major thirds. Syntonic commas were distributed across most sequences of four narrowed fifths, with one remaining correction accommodated usually in the diminished sixth G♯ to E♭, which expands to almost a justly tuned minor sixth. It is this interval that is usually called the "wolf", because it is so far from consonance.

The wolf was not a problem if music was played in a small number of keys (or to be more precise, transposed modes) with few accidentals, but it prevented players from transposing and modulating freely. Some instrument-makers sought to remedy the problem by introducing more than twelve notes per octave, producing enharmonic keyboards which could provide, for example, a D♯ and an E♭ with different pitches so that the thirds B–D♯ and E♭–G could both be euphonious. These solutions could include split keys and multiple manuals; one such solution, the archicembalo, was mentioned by Nicola Vicentino in 1555.

However, Werckmeister realised that split keys, or "subsemitonia" as he called them, were unnecessary, and even counterproductive in music with chromatic progressions and extensive modulations. He described a series of tunings where enharmonic notes had the same pitch: in other words, the same note was used as both (say) E♭ and D♯, thereby "bringing the keyboard into the form of a circle". This refers to the fact that the notes or keys may be arranged in a circle of fifths and it is possible to modulate from one key to another without restriction. This is also the source of the terms "circular temperament" or "circulating temperament".

Although equal temperament is discussed by Werckmeister in his treatises, it is distinguished from non-equal well temperaments.

== Forms ==
The term "well temperament" or "good temperament" usually means some sort of irregular temperament in which the tempered fifths are of different sizes but no key has very impure intervals. Historical irregular temperaments usually have the narrowest fifths between the diatonic notes ("naturals") producing purer thirds, and wider fifths among the chromatic notes ("sharps and flats"). Each key thus has a slightly different pattern of interval ratios, and hence different keys have distinct characters. Such "key-color" was an essential part of much 18th- and 19th-century music and was described in treatises of the period.

One of the earliest recorded circular temperaments was described by the organist Arnolt Schlick in the early 16th century. However, "well temperaments" did not become widely used until the Baroque period. They persisted through the Classical period, and even survived into the second half of 19th century in some areas, for example in Italy.

There are many well temperament schemes, some nearer meantone temperament, others nearer 12-tone equal temperament. Although such tunings have no wolf fifth, keys with many sharps or flats still do not sound very pure, due to their thirds. This can create contrast between chords in which vibrations are concordant with others where the vibrations are not harmonically related and thus beat.

Some modern theorists such as Owen Jorgensen have sought to define "well temperament" more narrowly to exclude fifths wider than pure, which rules out many such schemes.

Some well-known well temperaments go by the following names:

- Werckmeister (invented by Andreas Werckmeister)
- French Temperament ordinaire
- Neidhardt
- Kirnberger
- Kellner
- Vallotti (invented by Francesco Antonio Vallotti)
- Young

Some temperament schemes feature numbers of perfect, pure fifths and these give enhanced harmonic resonance to instruments and music on which they are played so that music moves into and out of focus between keys as vibrations lock together or not. Werckmeister features 8 perfect fifths, Kellner 7 and Vallotti 6. Alternatively, "Reverse Lehman-Bach 14," a system by Kees Van Den Doel, features only 3 pure perfect fifths in exchange for optimal major thirds, with none wider than a Pythagorean Third.

The contemporary composer Douglas Leedy has written several works for harpsichord or organ in which the use of a well temperament is required.

== See also ==
- Pythagorean tuning
- Just intonation
- Meantone temperament
- Regular temperament
- Equal temperament
