= Keyboard =

Keyboard may refer to:

== Text input ==
- Keyboard, part of a typewriter
- Computer keyboard

== Music ==
- Musical keyboard, a set of adjacent keys or levers used to play a musical instrument
  - Manual (music), a keyboard played with hands, as opposed to;
  - Pedalboard or pedal keyboard, played with feet
  - Enharmonic keyboard, one of several layouts that incorporate more than 12 tones per octave
- Keyboard instrument, a musical instrument played using a keyboard
  - Synthesizer; can be controlled by an electronic keyboard
  - Electronic keyboard, a synthesizer
  - Keyboard percussion instrument, a family of pitched percussion instruments arranged in the layout of a keyboard

=== Publications ===
- Keyboard (magazine), a magazine dedicated to keyboard instruments and digital music

== See also ==
- Input method
- Keypad
