= Vallotti =

"Vallotti" may refer to:

- Francesco Antonio Vallotti, an Italian composer, music theorist, and organist.
- Vallotti temperament, a musical well-temperament devised by the aforementioned Francesco Vallotti
