= Johann Kirnberger =

German composer (1721–1783)

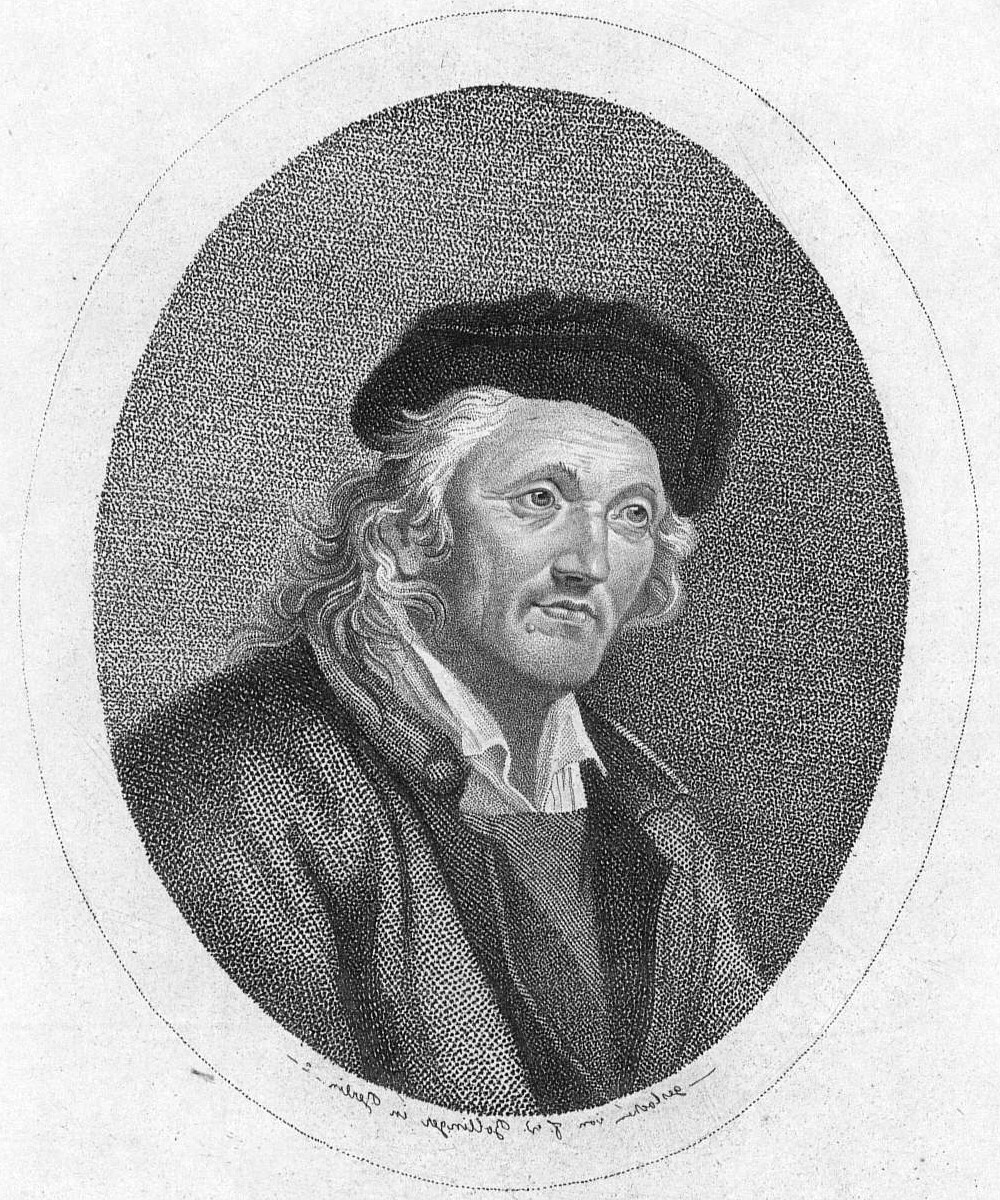
Johann Kirnberger

Johann Philipp Kirnberger (also Kernberg; 24 April 1721, Saalfeld – 27 July 1783, Berlin) was a musician, composer (primarily of fugues) and music theorist. He studied the organ with Johann Peter Kellner and Heinrich Nicolaus Gerber, and starting in 1738 he studied with the violinist Meil in Sondershausen, but most significant is the time he spent from 1739 until 1741 (with breaks) studying performance and composition with Johann Sebastian Bach.

Between 1741 and 1751 Kirnberger lived and worked in Poland for powerful magnates including Lubomirski, Poninski, and Rzewuski before ending up at the Benedictine Cloister in Lviv (then part of Poland). He spent much time collecting Polish national dances and compiled them in his treatise Die Charaktere der Tänze. Kirnberger played a significant role in the intellectual and cultural exchange between Germany and Poland in the mid-18th century.

Kirnberger became a violinist at the court of Frederick the Great in 1751. He was the music director to the Prussian Princess Anna Amalia from 1758 until his death.

Kirnberger greatly admired Johann Sebastian Bach, deeming him "the greatest of all composers". Kirnberger sought to secure the publication of all of Bach's chorale settings, which finally appeared after Kirnberger's death; see Kirnberger chorale preludes (BWV 690–713). Many of Bach's manuscripts have been preserved in Kirnberger's library (the "Kirnberger collection").

Kirnberger is known today primarily for his theoretical work Die Kunst des reinen Satzes in der Musik (The Art of Strict Composition in Music, 1774, 1779). The well-tempered tuning systems known as "Kirnberger II" and "Kirnberger III" are associated with his name (see Kirnberger temperament), as is a rational version of equal temperament (see schisma). One of his most familiar compositions is Fuga in C-dur für Orgel ("Fanfare" Fugue), which was formerly attributed to Johann Sebastian Bach and then to his son Carl Philipp Emanuel Bach.
