= Enharmonic keyboard =

Type of musical keyboard

An enharmonic keyboard is a musical keyboard, where enharmonically equivalent notes do not have identical pitches. A conventional keyboard has, for instance, only one key and pitch for C♯ and D♭, but an enharmonic keyboard would have two different keys and pitches for these notes. Traditionally, such keyboards use black split keys to express both notes, (Note: "The concept of enharmonicity arises from the fact that certain tone pairs seem to refer to almost identical pitches. For example, from a given C we ... will find that the pitches of C♯ and D♭ are close to each other (exactly how close will depend on the methods we allow for finding them). C♯ and D♭ are obviously not identical, but they are close enough to be treated as identical in certain musical settings. Therefore, they are enharmonically equivalent. An enharmonic instrument is an instrument where multiple ways of producing enharmonically equivalent tones are available. For example, an enharmonic keyboard could have separate keys for C♯ and D♭, as well as for each tone in other enharmonic pairs such as D♯ / E♭, F♯ / G♭, G♯ / A♭ and A♯ / B♭. An enharmonic keyboard is thus guaranteed to have more than 12 keys per octave.") (Note: "Enharmonic instruments should be understood as musical instruments presenting a number of pitches per octave that significantly surpasses the twelve notes of the standard western tuning systems (equal temperament, meantone tuning or whatever). This begins with harpsichords or organs with a few split upper keys, goes to keyboards with 17, 19, 31 or 43 notes per octave and ends with theoretical systems and ideas for instruments (less often the instruments themselves) up to far over 100 pitches per octave") but diatonic white keys may also be split. (Note: "Note, however, that the extra keys need not be found among the sharps and flats. For example, Barbieri (2008), p. 20 shows an organ from the end of the 1400s with no extra black keys but with two E keys, one suitable for use in an E major chord, and another better fitted as the third in a C major chord".)

As an important device to compose, play and study enharmonic music, (Note: "Enharmonic music is music ... that is mostly to be found in the surroundings of enharmonic instruments. Without those instruments nearby, it makes little sense to produce such music".) enharmonic keyboards are capable of producing microtones and have separate keys for at least some pairs of not equal pitches that must be enharmonically equal in conventional keyboard instruments.

== The term (divergence of scholar opinions) ==
"Enharmonic keyboard" is a term used by scholars in their studies of enharmonic keyboard instruments (organ, harpsichord, piano, harmonium and synthesizer) with reference to a keyboard with more than 12 keys per octave. Scholarly consensus about the term's precise definition currently has not been established.

The New Grove Dictionary (2001) defines an "enharmonic keyboard" as "a keyboard with more than 12 keys and sounding more than 12 different pitches in the octave", however the article does not specify the origin of the term. Rasch (2002) suggested applying the term "enharmonic keyboard" more precisely, to keyboards with 29–31 keys per octave.

Barbieri (2007), in his turn, raised the objection that this use of the term is contrary to early theoretical works. (Note: The only theoretical evidence that agrees with Rasch's usage is found in one (not yet published) manuscript by some Benedetto Bresciani, written c. 1719. As for historical evidence, confusion has often reigned over the terminology of split-keyed instruments, which were sometimes called chromatic, sometimes enharmonic. The builders (or persons who only described the construction) of such keyboard instruments often gave them names without any reference to genus, like archicembalo (Nicola Vicentino), cembalo pentarmonico (Giovanni Battista Doni), clavicymbalum universale (Michael Praetorius) or even simply clauocembalo (that is clavicembalo; Gioseffo Zarlino.) (Note: "In 1548 Dominicus Pizaurensis has built harpsichord with 19 divisions of the octave by the order and description of G. Zarlino ... the earliest enarmonic instrument ... manufacture date of which is known exactly Russian: В 1548 году Доминикус Пизауренсис построил клавесин с 19 делениями в октаве по заказу и описанию Дж. Царлино... самый ранний энармонический инструмент... дата изготовления которого известна точно)

Some modern scholars [e.g. Wraight & Stembridge (1994)] describe instruments with such keyboards as split-keyed instruments.

== Known realizations ==
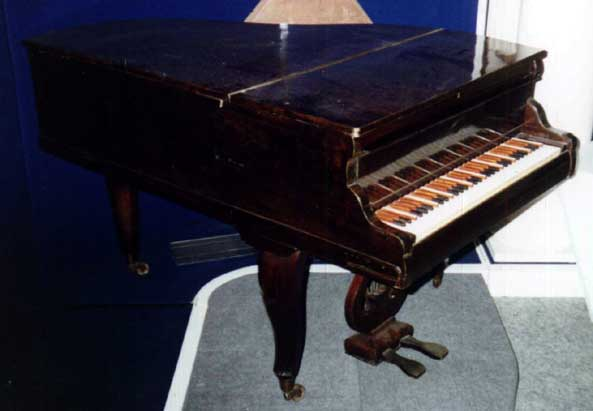
Odoevsky's enharmonic klavitsin (Russia, 1864), in fact piano with 19 keys per octave

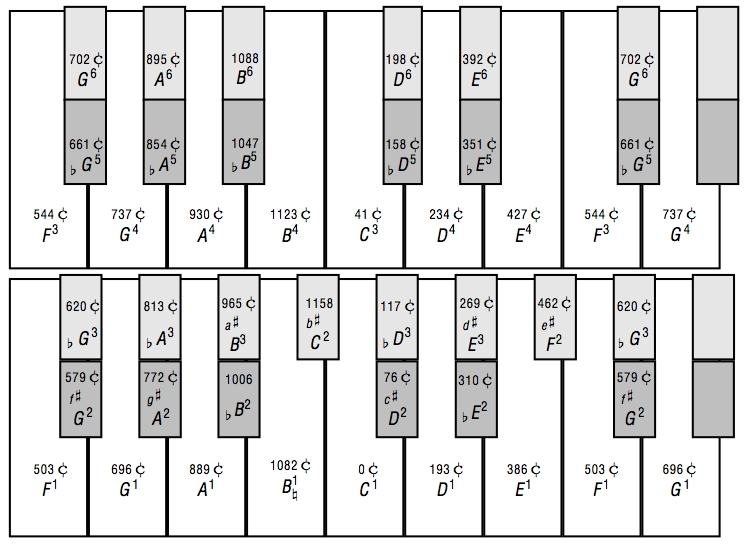
Vicentino's enharmonic keyboard (Italy, 1555) with version of tuning in cents

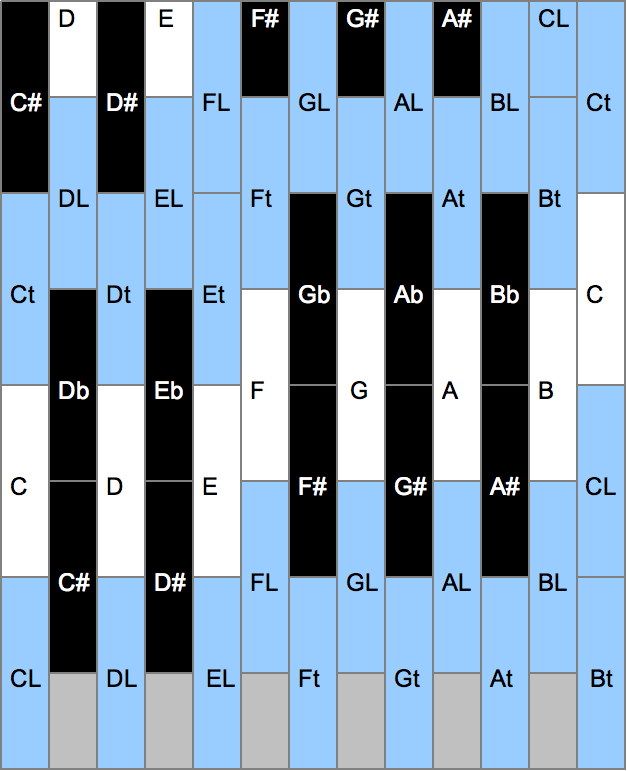
Schematic representation of Fokker's microtonal keyboard for a 31 EDO pipe organ (Fokker organ) with two manuals and pedal, built by him

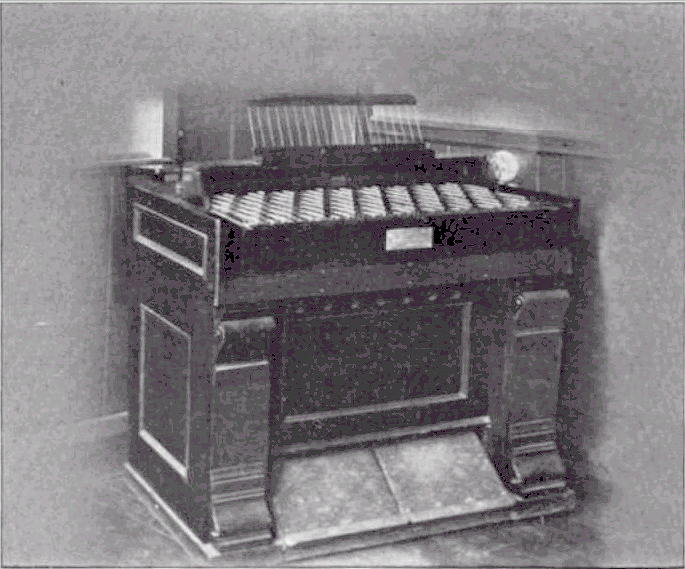
Joseph Alley's enharmonic reed organ (U.S., c. 1867, 5 limit J.I. non-closed)

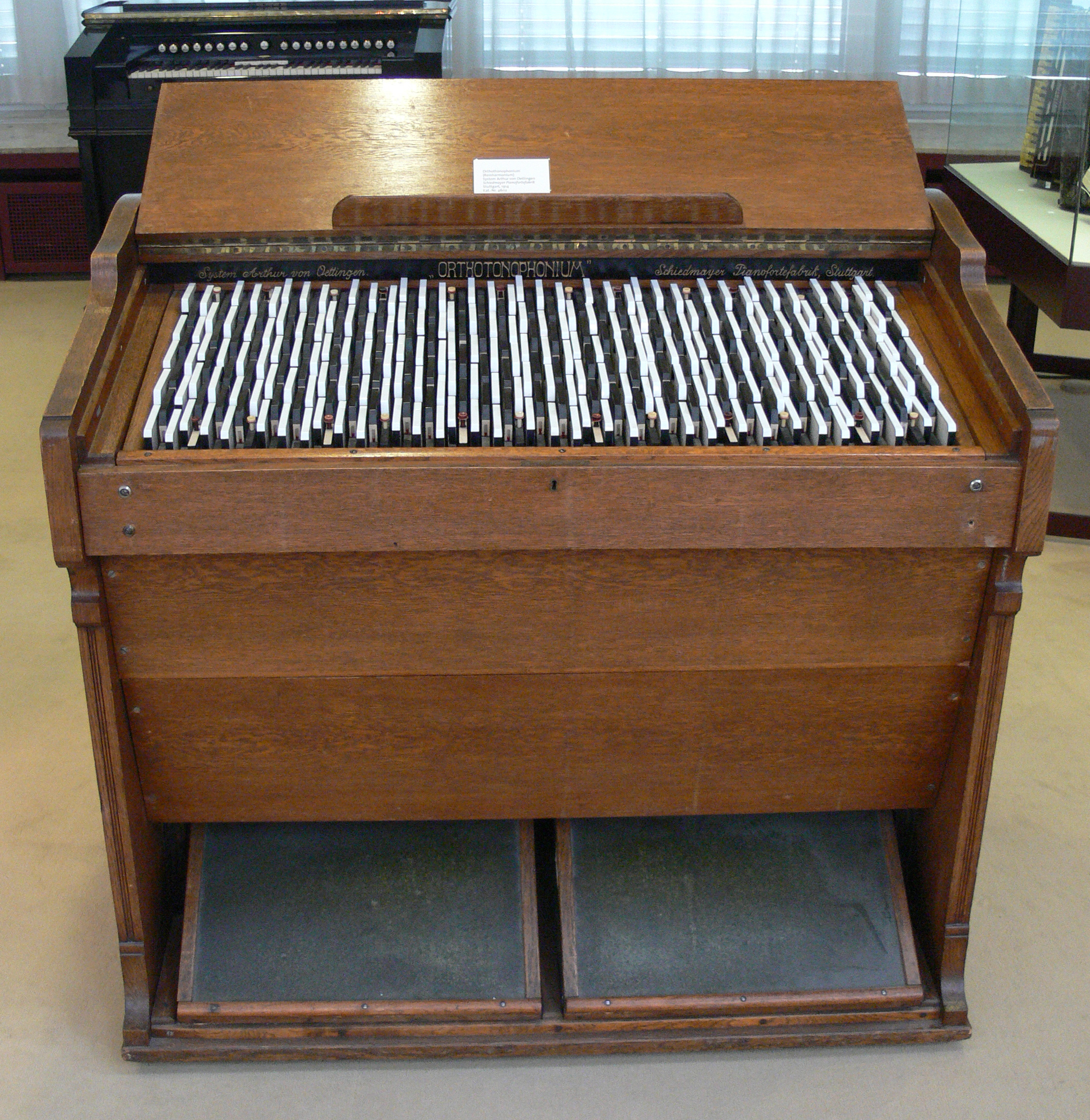
von Oettingen's orthotonophonium (Germany, 1914). 53 EDO, 60 keys per octave

One of the first instruments with an enharmonic keyboard was the archicembalo built by Nicola Vicentino, an Italian Renaissance composer and music theorist. The archicembalo had 36 keys per octave and was very well suited for meantone temperament. (Note: The best description of archicembalo along with recordings using the rebuilt instrument can be found in Cordes (2007) There are many other descriptions of archicembalo given by modern scholars, e.g. in Stembridge (1993), p. 54 ff) Vicentino also had made one arciorgano in Rome and one arciorgano in Milan. Both pipe organs were equipped with enharmonic keyboards, like those of the archicembalo. None of Vicentino's instruments survive.

Many instruments with enharmonic keyboards were built during the Renaissance and Baroque eras. Most composers and performers who used these instruments are virtually unknown today. Among them are Johann Kaspar Kerll's teacher, Giovanni Valentini, who played a harpsichord with 77 keys for 4 octaves (19 keys per octave plus one extra C), and Friedrich Suppig, published one of the definitive works for an instrument with an enharmonic keyboard: The Fantasia of the Labyrinthus Musicus, which is a multi-sectional composition that makes use of all 24 keys and is intended for a keyboard with 31 notes per octave and pure major thirds.

With the advent of microtonal music in the 20th century, instruments with enharmonic keyboards became more fashionable, as did early and Baroque music for such instruments. For performance and recording purposes, either old instruments are reconstructed or two recordings of two differently tuned instruments are combined in one, thus creating an effect of an enharmonic keyboard.

Isomorphic note-layouts are a class of enharmonic keyboard, opened in 1721 by Ivo Salzinger's Tastatura nova perfecta, Germany. One isomorphic note-layout, the Wicki, when mapped to a hexagonal array of buttons, is particularly well-suited to the control of enharmonic scales. The orientation of its hexagonal columns of octaves and tempered perfect fifths place all the notes of every well-formed scale – pentatonic (cardinality 5), diatonic (cardinality 7), chromatic (cardinality 12), and enharmonic (cardinality 19) – in a tight, contiguous cluster.

The notes of each progressively-higher cardinality are appended to the outer edges of the lower-cardinality scale, such that each well-formed scale's note-controlling buttons are embedded, unchanged, within the set of those controlling the higher-cardinality scales. Hence, the skills gained in learning to play chromatic music on a chromatic Wicki keyboard can be applied, without modification, to performance on an enharmonic Wicki keyboard.

Isomorphic keyboards were not discovered until the latter half of the 19th century.

== See also ==
- Equal temperament
- Fokker organ
- Meantone temperament
- Musical tuning
- Jankó keyboard
