= Kirnberger temperament =

Three irregular temperaments developed by Johann Kirnberger

The Kirnberger temperaments are three irregular temperaments developed in the second half of the 18th century by Johann Kirnberger. Kirnberger was a student of Johann Sebastian Bach who greatly admired his teacher; he was one of Bach's principal proponents.

Kirnberger's tuning systems, or well temperaments, are a way to artificially splice together two arcs on the "natural" spiral of fifths to turn it into an "unnatural" circle. In Kirnberger's and his teacher Bach's time, keyboard musicians were experimenting with different unobtrusive ways to alter the spacing of notes around the spiral of fifths to close it into a circle, so that every note needed for every key was at hand, even if some rarely used key signatures might be very dissonant, but tolerable.

The first Kirnberger temperament, Kirnberger I, had similarities to Pythagorean tuning, which stressed the importance of perfect fifths all throughout the spiral of fifths. His later tuning system(s), Kirnberger II and Kirnberger III, dispensed with perfectly tuned 3 / 2 Pythagorean fifths and instead improve the harmony of major and minor thirds in chords, which are necessarily spoiled by adhering to perfectly tuned fifths (unless there are an unworkably huge number of distinct pitches in each octave: at least 31, and perhaps 53).

== Closing the ends of the spiral of fifths into a circle ==
In almost all tuning systems, the so-called "circle" of fifths is not a circle: Randomly chosen fifth sizes, or fifths chosen to produce greater consonance among other notes in a chord almost always form a spiral. Some impractical but very consonant circular tuning systems exist, such as 31 tone equal temperament and 53 equal temperament, but the number of separate notes required to fill out any one octave on a keyboard far exceeds the space available on a playable keyboard (and the vast majority of the extra notes would probably never be played during the entire working life of the instrument). For the most part, keyboardists insist that their pianos, harpsichords, and midi keyboards be limited to around 12 notes per octave, since no keyboard can be played that is so widened up with excess notes that a human hand cannot stretch across a whole chord, nor can the keys on the board be made so narrow – to fit more in the span of an ordinary player's hand – that even a skillful musician will often strike the wrong key among the tiny, closely packed notes.

The number 12 or so notes per octave is commonly used because after stepping up 12 fifths in sequence (and dropping down a whole octave as needed to remain in the original octave) the 12th note is almost the same pitch as the note the spiral started on; the error in pitch is called a Pythagorean comma; it's about a half of a quarter tone – just the right size to sound completely awful. A complete circle of perfect fifths is just not possible, because instead of returning to the tone that started the sequence, any sequence of exact 3 / 2 fifths will have overshot its original pitch by about 23 musical cents. Some type of fudging is needed; among the options are well temperaments, such as Kirnberger I, II, and III.

Thus, if one tunes in fifths, matching by ear from C–G, G–D, D–A, A–E, E–B, B–F♯, F♯–C♯, C♯–G♯, then crosses over from G♯ to A♭ (G♯ and A♭ are different pitches in nearly every tuning system, but are also very close, enabling musical subterfuge; for example, both can be replaced by their only slightly out of tune average frequency), then from A♭–E♭, E♭–B♭, B♭–F, and finishing with F–C. However, the ending C will not be the same frequency as the starting C: The first and last Cs will have a discrepancy of about 23 cents (a Pythagorean comma), which would be unacceptable: A comma is almost the definition of an intolerably horrible dissonance. This difference between the initial C and final C that is derived from performing a series of perfect tunings is generally referred to as the Pythagorean comma.

In Kirnberger I, the D–A fifth is reduced by a syntonic comma, making the major thirds F–A, C–E, G–B, and D–F♯ pure, though the fifth based on D is a ratio of 40 / 27 instead of 3 / 2 (680.4 cents instead of 702.0 cents). His subsequent systems II and III, as well as many other tuning systems, have been developed to "spread around" that comma, that is, to divide that anomalous musical space among the other intervals of the scale.

| Note | Exact frequency ratio | Value in cents |
|---|---|---|
| C | $\frac{1}{1}$ | 0 |
| C♯ | $\frac{256}{243}$ | 90.225 |
| D | $\frac{9}{8}$ | 203.910 |
| D♯ | $\frac{32}{27}$ | 294.135 |
| E | $\frac{5}{4}$ | 386.314 |
| F | $\frac{4}{3}$ | 498.045 |
| F♯ | $\frac{45}{32}$ | 590.224 |
| G | $\frac{3}{2}$ | 701.955 |
| G♯ | $\frac{128}{81}$ | 792.180 |
| A | $\frac{5}{3}$ | 884.359 |
| B♭ | $\frac{16}{9}$ | 996.090 |
| B | $\frac{15}{8}$ | 1088.269 |

== Practical temperaments: Kirnberger II ==
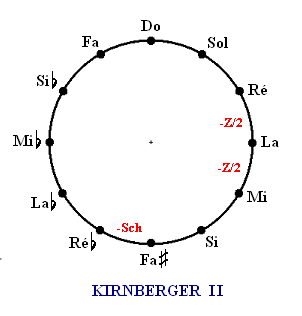
Kirnberger II temperament; −Z/2 marks a tempered fifth flattened by a half comma; −Sch marks a schisma

Kirnberger's first method of compensating for and closing the circle of fifths was to split the "wolf" interval, known to those who have used meantone temperaments, in half between two different fifths. That is, to compensate for the one extra comma, he removed half a comma from two of the formerly perfect fifths in order to complete the circle. In so doing, he allowed the remaining fifths to stay pure. At the time, however, pure thirds were valued more than pure fifths. (Quarter comma meantone temperament has eight exactly pure thirds, but sacrifices four entire chords to achieve this end.) So, Kirnberger allowed for three pure thirds, the rest being slightly wide and the worst being three Pythagorean thirds (22 cents wider than pure) on the opposite end of the circle from the pure thirds. To put it graphically:

C-----G-----D------A-----E-----B-----F♯-----C♯-----Ab(G♯)-----Eb-----Bb-----F-----C 
  p      p     −½    −½     p     p      p      p          p      p      p     p
|__________pure 3rd______|
     |__________pure 3rd______|
            |_______pure 3rd________|
                              |__________Pythag. 3rd_________|
                                     |_________Pythag. 3rd___________|
                                            |________Pythag. 3rd___________|

The above table represents Kirnberger II temperament. The first row under the intervals shows either a "p" for pure, or "−1/2" for those intervals narrowed to close the circle of fifths (D–A), (A–E). Below these are shown the pure 3rds (between C–E, G–B, D–F♯), and Pythagorean (very wide) 3rds (B–D♯, F♯–A♯(almost B♭), D♭–F.)

| Note | Exact frequency ratio | Value in cents |
|---|---|---|
| C | $\frac{1}{1}$ | 0 |
| C♯ | $\frac{256}{243}$ | 90.225 |
| D | $\frac{9}{8}$ | 203.910 |
| D♯ | $\frac{32}{27}$ | 294.135 |
| E | $\frac{5}{4}$ | 386.314 |
| F | $\frac{4}{3}$ | 498.045 |
| F♯ | $\frac{45}{32}$ | 590.224 |
| G | $\frac{3}{2}$ | 701.955 |
| G♯ | $\frac{128}{81}$ | 792.180 |
| A | $3\sqrt{5} \over{4}$ | 895.112 |
| B♭ | $\frac{16}{9}$ | 996.090 |
| B | $\frac{15}{8}$ | 1088.269 |

Tempering any musical scale, however, is always a give-and-take situation: No temperament is a perfect solution to the fixed tuning problem. However, one must remember that tempering only really applies to instruments with fixed pitch: Any keyboard instrument, fixed-fretted instrument (lutes, viols, guitars), harps, and so forth. Musicians playing brass instruments, woodwinds, almost all bowed-string players, and singers all have a degree of control over the exact pitch and intonation of what they play, and may therefore be free of such restrictive systems. When the two classes of players come together, it is important when evaluating a temperament to consider the tendencies of the instruments vs. those of the temperament. Kirnberger II would only have been applicable to harps and keyboard instruments such as the harpsichord and organ. The advantages of this system are its three pure major thirds and its ten pure fifths; the disadvantages are, of course, the two narrow "half-wolf" fifths and the three Pythagorean, super-wide thirds. The chords are not entirely unusable but certainly must not be used frequently nor in close succession within the course of a piece.

== Kirnberger III ==
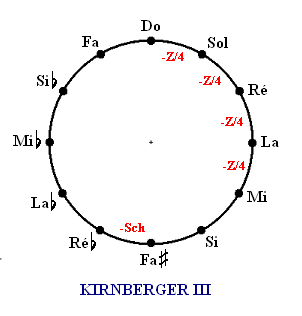
Kirnberger III temperament; −Z/4 marks a tempered fifth flattened by a quarter comma; −Sch marks a schisma.

After some disappointment with his sour, narrow fifths, Kirnberger experimented further and developed another possibility, later named the Kirnberger III.

This temperament, however, was not released during Kirnberger's lifetime, as he only described it in a private communication to Johann Nikolaus Forkel. The first publication of Kirnberger III was in the Allgemeine Musikalische Zeitung in 1871 by Heinrich Bellermann.

This temperament splits the Syntonic comma between four fifths instead of two; 1 / 4 comma tempered fifths are used extensively in meantone and are much easier to tune and to listen to. This also eliminates two of the three pure thirds found in Kirnberger II. Therefore, only one third remains pure (between C and E), and there are fewer Pythagorean thirds. A greater middle ground is reached in this improvement, and each key is closer to being equal to the next. The drawback is an aesthetic one: Fewer chords have pure thirds and fifths. But every temperament system is a mix of give-and-take compromises; each finds a way of dealing with the comma.

| Note | Exact frequency ratio | Value in cents |
|---|---|---|
| C | $\frac{1}{1}$ | 0 |
| C♯ | $\frac{256}{243}$ | 90.225 |
| D | $\sqrt{5} \over{2}$ | 193.157 |
| D♯ | $\frac{32}{27}$ | 294.135 |
| E | $\frac{5}{4}$ | 386.314 |
| F | $\frac{4}{3}$ | 498.045 |
| F♯ | $\frac{45}{32}$ | 590.224 |
| G | $\sqrt[4]{5}$ | 696.578 |
| G♯ | $\frac{128}{81}$ | 792.180 |
| A | $\sqrt[4]{5^3} \over{2}$ | 889.735 |
| B♭ | $\frac{16}{9}$ | 996.090 |
| B | $\frac{15}{8}$ | 1088.269 |

== See also ==
- Construction der gleichschwebenden Temperatur
- Meantone temperament
- Friedrich Wilhelm Marpurg
- Well temperament
