= Friedrich Suppig =

Friedrich Suppig was an 18th-century music theorist and composer. Practically nothing is known about him or his life, or even if he was in fact a professional composer. He is known for two manuscripts; in one of which he discussed theoretical tuning systems:

- Calculus musicus is a treatise on tuning systems: a 19-tone just intonation and a 31-tone system. According to the research of John Charles Francis, a further tuning system may be shown in diagrammatic form on the cover sheet.
- Labyrinthus musicus contains a short preface and a musical composition entitled Fantasia, which uses all 24 keys and is intended for an enharmonic keyboard with 31 notes per octave and pure major thirds.

Both manuscripts are dated Dresden, 24 June 1722.

Johann Mattheson mentioned the Labyrinthus musicus in his Critica musica (1722), describing Suppig as an organist in the Dresden suburbs. In 1863, the document was in the possession of Louis Kindscher of Köthen who mentioned the work in the periodical Euterpe (22, 1863). Although the manuscripts were dedicated to the government of Dresden, the surviving documents surfaced in Köthen in the 19th century. It follows that either they did not become the property of the city of Dresden, or that they were returned to Suppig for some reason, or else they are copies.

== References and further reading ==
- Fredrich Suppig, Labyrinthus musicus, Calculus musicus, facsimile of the manuscripts. Tuning and Temperament Library volume 3, edited by Rudolf Rasch. Diapason Press, 1990.
- Suppig Unveiled
