= Francesco Antonio Vallotti =

Italian composer

- Born: June 11, 1697; Vercelli
- Died: January 10, 1780 (aged 82) Padua
- Genres: Classical
- Occupation(s): Composer, Music theorist, Organist, Priest
- Instrument: Organ

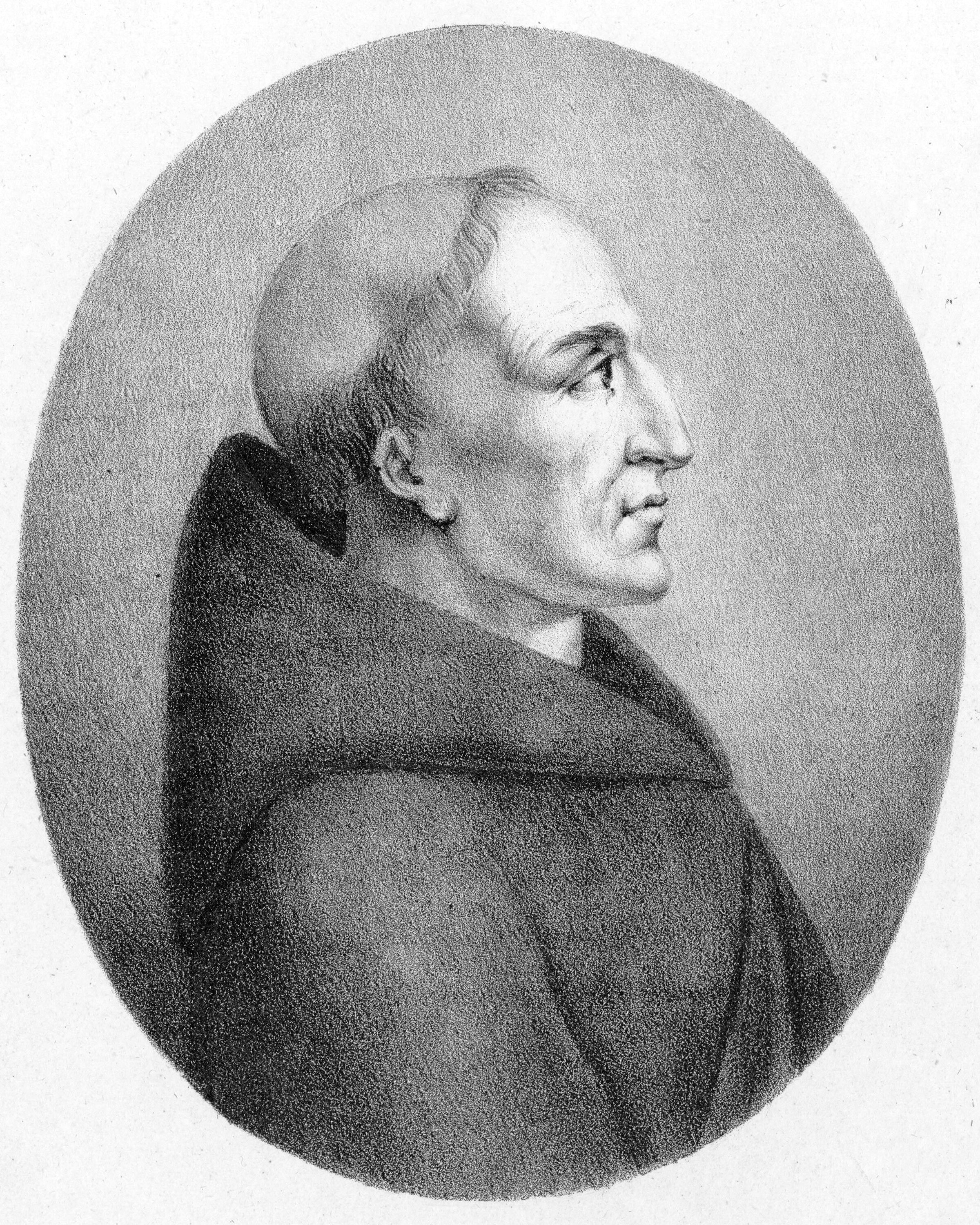
Francesco Antonio Vallotti

Francesco Antonio Vallotti (11 June 1697 – 10 January 1780) was an Italian composer, music theorist, and organist.

== Life ==
He was born in Vercelli. He studied with G. A. Bissone at the church of St. Eusebius. Noticed by the Padre Beccaria of Vercelli, he was sent to complete the novitiate in Chamberry circa 1715. He returned to Savoy and joined the Franciscan order in 1716. He studied philosophy in Cuneo and theology in Padua. He was ordained as a priest in 1720. In 1722 he became an organist at the Basilica di Sant'Antonio in Padua, and eventually become maestro there in 1730, succeeding maestro Calegari, and held that position for the next fifty years. Here he met and worked with another theorist and composer named Giuseppe Tartini. Vallotti died in Padua on 10 January 1780.

== Theory ==
Vallotti spent a great deal of thought on the theory of harmony and counterpoint. His theoretical endeavours would culminate in 1779 with the publishing of his 167-page, four-volume work, Della scienza teorica e pratica della moderna musica (On the scientific theory and practice of modern music), just before the end of his life.

One of his most frequently cited contributions to theory was his development of a system of Well temperament, known today as Vallotti temperament, which was one of many systems of instrumental tuning for the accommodation of composition in every key. Specifically, the six diatonic fifths F-C-G-D-A-E-B are all tuned 1/6 of a comma flat, while the remaining six-fifths B-F#-C#-G#-D#-A#-F are all tuned pure. This leads to thirds quite close to pure (compared to equal temperament) in the 'home' keys of F, C and G major and in D, A, E and B minor. 1/6 comma extended meantone intonation (the 55-comma system) was the standard intonation ideal in the 18th century. On the other hand, there were very impure Pythagorean thirds in the remote keys of B, F# and C# major and in G#, Eb, Bb and F minor. The keys in between progressed from meantone to Pythagorean as the number of accidentals increased, with Eb and A major (the two 'intermediate' major keys) having thirds the same width as in modern 12-tone equal temperament. In effect, the 'simpler' the key, the closer it is to meantone intonation, and the more remote the key, the closer it is to Pythagorean intonation, and the 'middle' keys are similar to equal temperament. Young temperament (q.v.) No.2 has the same structure as Vallotti's, except that there the split happens at C rather than F: that is, the block of fifths C-G-D-A-E-B-F# are all tuned 1/6 of a comma flat, and F#-C#-G#-D#-A#-F-C are all tuned pure.

== Work ==
Vallotti's extant compositions are entirely sacred in nature. They include:

- Responsorial for four voices accompanied by harpsichord
- Responsorial for sabbato sancto
- Responsorial for coena domini

Many of his works remain only in manuscript. These include:

- 12 Introits for 5 and 8 voices
- 24 Kyries, 24 Glorias, and 21 Credos for 4 and 5 voices
- 68 Psalms for 2 and 8 voices and instruments
- 46 Hymns
- 10 Responsorials
- 3 Dies Irae for 4 voices and instruments
- 2 Pange lingua
- 15 Tantum ergo
- 2 Te Deum
- 2 De profundis
- 1 Sepulto domino, vespers and other compositions

He also orchestrated 43 sacred pieces by his former master Calegari, and an Introit in 5 voices by Porta.
