= Nicola Vicentino =

Italian composer

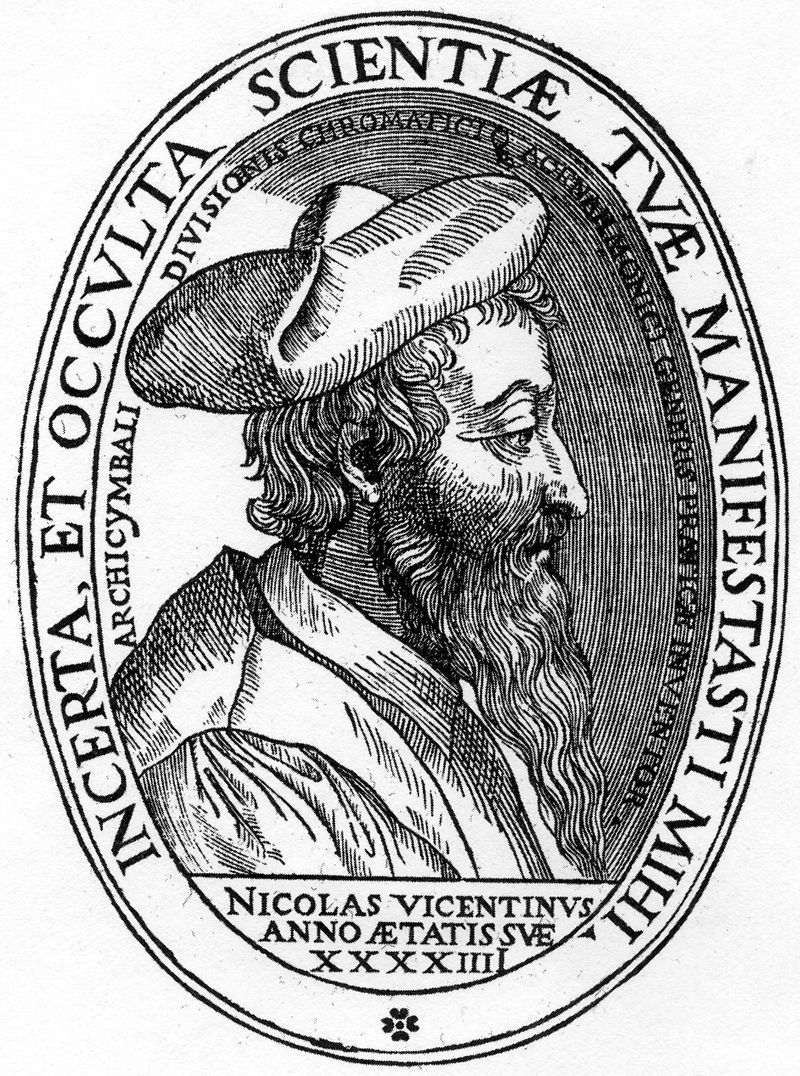
Frontispiece in the Vicentino's treatise on music. Inscriptions: 1 (outer circle) Incerta et occulta scientiae tuae manifestasti mihi; 2 (inner circle) Archicymbali divisionis chromaticique ac enarmonici generis praticae inventor; 3 (under the portrait) Nicolas Vicentinus anno aetatis suae XXXXIIII

Nicola Vicentino (1511 – 1575 or 1576) was an Italian music theorist and composer of the Renaissance. He was one of the most progressive musicians of the age, inventing, among other things, a microtonal keyboard.

== Life ==
Little is known of his early life. Born in Vicenza, he may have studied with Adrian Willaert in Venice, which was close by, and he acquired an early interest in the contemporary humanistic revival, including the study of ancient Greek music theory and performance practice (about which little was known, but was then being uncovered, through the work of scholars such as Girolamo Mei and Giangiorgio Trissino).

At some time in the 1530s or early 1540s, he went to Ferrara, which was to become the center for experimental secular music in Italy from the middle to the end of the 16th century. Apparently, he served as a music tutor to the Duke of Ferrara and some of his family members in the House of Este, and some of Vincentino's music was sung at the court of Ferrara.

During the late 1540s, his reputation as a music theorist grew. He established his reputation as a composer with his publication of a book of madrigals in Venice in 1546, and in 1551 he took part in one of the most famous events in 16th century music theory, the debate between Vicente Lusitano and himself in Rome in 1551. The topic of the debate was the relationship of the ancient Greek genera to contemporary music practice, in particular whether contemporary music could be explained in terms of the diatonic genus alone (as Lusitano claimed) or (as Vicentino claimed) was best described as a combination of the diatonic, chromatic, and enharmonic genera, the last of which contained a microtone. The debate was rather unlike those among contemporary musicologists, being more like a refereed prize fight, with a panel of judges; they awarded the prize to Lusitano. In 1555 Vicentino published an account of the debate that was recognised as misleading at the time, but nevertheless went on to influence later composers.

Unbowed, Vicentino continued his experiments, and went on to build the archicembalo, which could play the music he described in his publications. Only one keyboard instrument using his 31-note-to-the-octave system survives from the Renaissance: the ‘Clavemusicum Omnitonum Modulis Diatonicis Cromaticis et Enearmonicis', built by Vito Trasuntino of Venice in 1606 to play the diatonic, chromatic and enharmonic. It is on display at the International museum and library of music in Bologna.

After a short time in Rome, Vicentino returned to Ferrara, and later moved to Siena. In 1563, he became maestro di cappella at Vicenza Cathedral, thus returning to his home city, but only briefly, for he accepted a position in Milan in 1565. Around 1570, he had some connection with the Bavarian court in Munich, though he may never have gone there. He died in Milan during the plague of 1575–1576, though his exact date of death is not known.

== Works ==
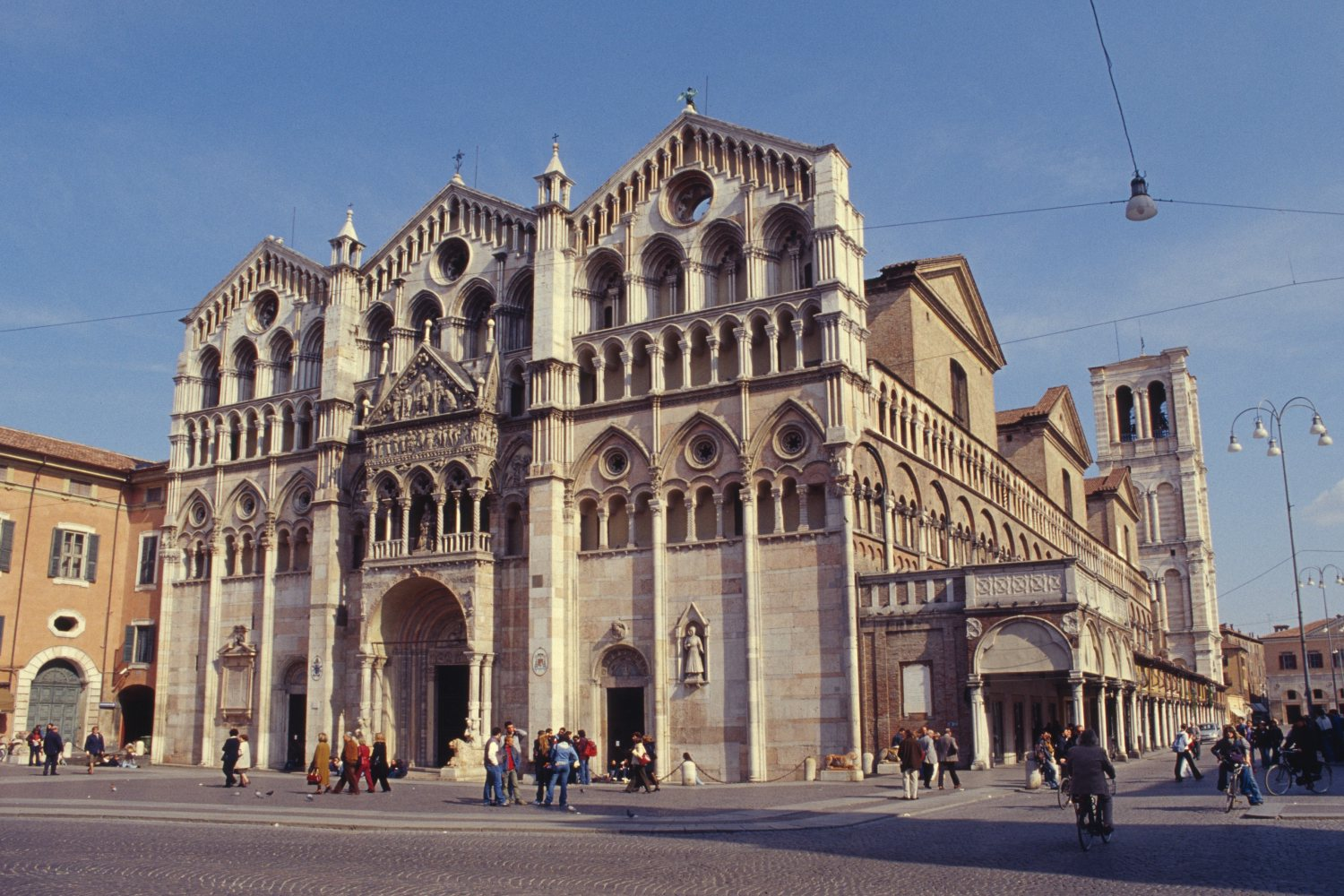
Cathedral of Ferrara. Ferrara was the principal center of chromatic experimentation in the second half of the 16th century.

While Vicentino was known as a composer, and wrote two books of madrigals and motets in a harmonically sophisticated style, it was his work as a music theorist that gained him renown.

In the 1550s, in Italy, there was a surge of interest in chromatic composition, some of which was part of the movement known as musica reservata, and some of which was motivated by research into ancient Greek music, including modes and genera. Composers such as Cipriano de Rore, Orlande de Lassus and others wrote music which was impossible to sing in tune without having a system for adjusting the pitch of chromatic intervals in some way. Several theorists attacked the problem, including Vicentino.

In 1555, he published his most famous work, L'antica musica ridotta alla moderna prattica (ancient music adapted to modern practice), in which he fully explained his ideas linking ancient Greek musical theory and practice with contemporary works. In this work, he expanded and justified many of the ideas which he first brought up in his debate with Lusitano. Whether or not Lusitano ever attempted to refute Vicentino's expanded version is not known; however, Vicentino's book was influential with the group of madrigalists working in Ferrara in the next two decades, including Luzzasco Luzzaschi and Carlo Gesualdo.

Another area in which Vicentino did original work was musical dynamics. He was one of the first theorists, and perhaps the first, to mention volume as an expressive parameter. In L'antica musica ridotta alla moderna prattica, he mentioned that the strength of singing must respect carefully the text and passage being sung.

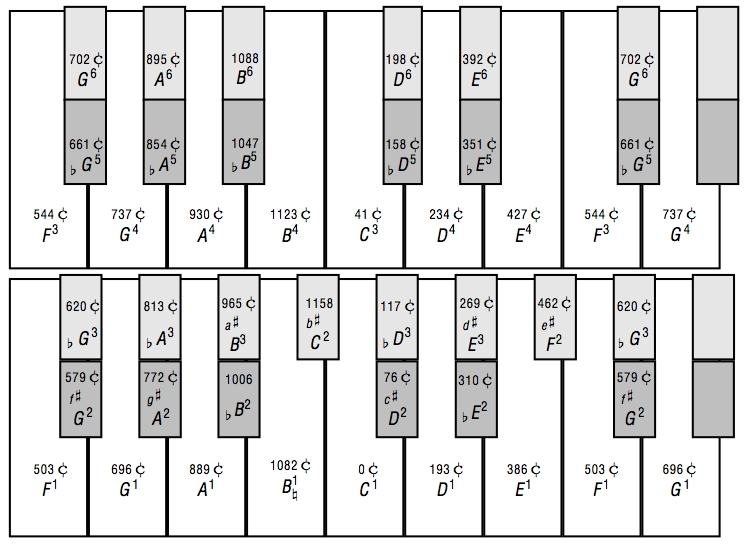
Keyboard of the archicembalo

Vicentino's most famous invention was the archicembalo, a keyboard containing 31 keys to the octave. Using this keyboard, it was possible to play acoustically satisfactory intervals in any key, and therefore some of the recently composed music in a chromatic style, which was only in tune when sung, could be played on the keyboard. Later he applied the same keyboard layout to the arciorgano, a microtonal keyboard for the organ. While these keyboards did not achieve wide popularity, they did offer a way of playing music in meantone temperament in all keys. The standard way to modulate through all keys on a keyboard instrument later became to divide the octave into twelve equal parts, called 12-tone equal temperament, in which the major and minor thirds are not well tuned. Vicentino's solution in effect divides the octave into 31 equal parts, with good intonation for the thirds and sixths but somewhat beating narrow fifths.

== References and further reading ==
- Jonathan Wild. "Genus, Species and Mode in Vicentino's 31-tone Compositional Theory", Music Theory Online 20.2. This article includes several remarkable recordings of vocal groups, retuned in the studio to the 31-tone system.
- Henry W. Kaufmann. The Life and Works of Nicola Vicentino. American Institute of Musicology, 1966. OCLC 906570.
- The New Grove Dictionary of Music and Musicians, ed. Stanley Sadie. 20 vol. London, Macmillan Publishers Ltd., 1980. ISBN 1-56159-174-2
- Gustave Reese, Music in the Renaissance. New York, W.W. Norton & Co., 1954. ISBN 0-393-09530-4
- Edwin M. Ripin: "Arcicembalo", Henry W. Kaufmann/Robert L. Kendrick, "Nicola Vicentino," Grove Music Online ed. L. Macy (Accessed January 8, 2005), Grove Music Online
- Vicentino, Nicola. (1555) L' antica musica ridotta alla moderna prattica. Antonio Barre, Rome. (Gallica)
- Barbieri, Patrizio. Enharmonic instruments and music, 1470-1900. (2008) Latina, Il Levante Libreria Editrice
- Nicola Vicentino. Ancient Music Adapted to Modern Practice. Translated, with Introduction and Notes, by Maria Rika Maniates.
- The Arch-Musician. BBC Radio 3 programme broadcast Saturday 27 March 2010; rebroadcast Saturday 23 July 2011
- Grantley McDonald. “Music, Magic, and Humanism in Late Sixteenth-Century Venice: Fabio Paolini and the Heritage of Ficino, Vicentino and Zarlino.” Journal of the Alamire Foundation 4 (2012): 52–78.
- Grantley McDonald. “Proportions of the Divine: Nicola Vicentino and Augustine’s Theology of the Trinity.” In Proportions. Science, Musique, Peinture & Architecture, ed. Sabine Rommeneaux, Philippe Vendrix and Vasco Zara (Turnhout: Brepols, 2012): 169–179.
