= Young temperament =

Pair of circulating temperaments described by Thomas Young

Young's first temperament
C major chord in Young's first temperament

In music theory, Young temperament is one of the circulating temperaments described by Thomas Young in a letter dated 9 July 1799, to the Royal Society of London. The letter was read at the Society's meeting of 16 January 1800, and included in its Philosophical Transactions for that year. (Note: Young's material on temperaments appears in Young (1800), pp. pages 143-147. The paper was reprinted in Nicholson's Journal in 1802 (Young (1802)), along with a list of errata (Young (1802, p. 167)), and a corrected version appeared in volume II of a collection of Young's works published in 1807 (Young (1807, pp. 531-554)). The original paper had contained an error in the placement of the first temperament's E♭ on a monochord (Barbour (2004, p. 168)).) The temperaments are referred to individually as Young's first temperament and Young's second temperament, more briefly as Young's No. 1 and Young's No. 2, or with some other variations of these expressions.

Young argued that there were good reasons for choosing a temperament to make "the harmony most perfect in those keys which are the most frequently used", and presented his first temperament as a way of achieving this. He gave his second temperament as a method of "very simply" producing "nearly the same effect". However, Young did not include practical tuning instructions, and his proposals did not enter common tuning literature.

== First temperament ==
In his first temperament, Young (1800) chose to make the major third C-E wider than just by 1/4 of a syntonic comma (about 5 cents,), and the major third F^{♯}-A^{♯} (≈ B^{♭}) wider than just by a full syntonic comma (about 22 cents,). He achieved the first by making each of the fifths C-G, G-D, D-A and A-E narrower than just by 3/16 of a syntonic comma, and the second by making each of the fifths F^{♯}-C^{♯}, C^{♯}-G^{♯}, G^{♯}-D^{♯} (E^{♭}) and E^{♭}-B^{♭} perfectly just. (Note: This article follows Barbour (2004) in labelling the notes of the chromatic scale as E^{♭}, B^{♭}, F, C, G, D, A, E, B, F♯, C^{♯}, and G^{♯}. In both of Young's temperaments all 12 notes on the circle of fifths are by definition intended to be used as replacements for their enharmonic equivalents: D^{♯} ↦ E^{♭} , A^{♯} ↦ B^{♭} , E^{♯} ↦ F^{♭} , B^{♯} ↦ C , F^{♭} ↦ E , C^{♭} ↦ B , G^{♭} ↦ F^{♯} , D^{♭} ↦ C^{♯} , and A^{♭} ↦ G^{♯} .) The remaining fifths, E-B, B-F^{♯}, B^{♭}-F and F-C were all made the same size, chosen so that the circle of fifths would close – that is, so that the total span of all twelve fifths would be exactly seven octaves. The resulting fifths are narrower than just by about 1/12 of a syntonic comma, or 1.8 cents. The precise difference is 3/16 of a syntonic comma less than 1/4 of a Pythagorean comma, differing from an equal temperament fifth by only about 1/8 of a cent. The exact and approximate numerical sizes of the three types of fifth, in cents, are as follows:

f_{1}	=	1200 [ 1/4 log_{2}( 3/2 ) + 3/16 log_{2}( 5 ) ]	≈ 697.92	flatter than just by 3/16 of a syntonic comma
f_{2}	=	1200 [ 3 − 5/4 log_{2}( 3 ) − 3/16 log_{2}( 5 ) ]	≈ 700.12	flatter than just by 1/4 of a Pythagorean comma, further flattened 3/16 of a syntonic comma
f_{3}	=	1200 log_{2}( 3/2 )	≈ 701.96	perfectly just
All number values are in musical cents.

Each of the major thirds in the resulting scale comprises four of these fifths less two octaves. If s_{j} f_{j} − 600 ( for j = 1, 2, 3 ) , the sizes of the major thirds can be conveniently expressed as in the second row of the table in Jorgensen (1991), Table 71-2, pp. 264-265. In these temperaments the intervals B-E^{♭}, F^{♯}-B^{♭}, C^{♯}-F, and G^{♯}-C, here written as diminished fourths, are identical to the major thirds B-D^{♯}, F^{♯}-A^{♯}, C^{♯}-E^{♯}, and G^{♯}-B^{♯}, respectively.

Major third	C-E	G-B, F-A	D-F^{♯}, B^{♭}-D	A-C^{♯}, E^{♭}-G	E-G^{♯}, G^{♯}-C	B-E^{♭}, C^{♯}-F	F^{♯}-B^{♭}
Width exact ≈ approx.	4 s_{1} ≈ 391.69	3 s_{1} + s_{2} ≈ 393.89	2 s_{1} + 2 s_{2} ≈ 396.09	s_{1} + 2 s_{2} + s_{3} ≈ 400.12	2 s_{2} + 2 s_{3} ≈ 404.15	s_{2} + 3 s_{3} ≈ 405.99	4 s_{3} ≈ 407.82
Deviation from just	+5.4	+7.6	+9.8	+13.8	+17.8	+19.7	+21.5
Deviation from just	All number values are in musical cents.						

As can be seen from the third row of the table, the widths of the tonic major thirds of successive major keys around the circle of fifths increase by about 2 cents ( s_{2} − s_{1} or s_{3} − s_{2} ) to 4 cents ( s_{3} − s_{1} ) per step in either direction from the narrowest, in C major, to the widest, in F^{♯} major.

The following table gives the pitch differences in cents between the notes of a chromatic scale tuned with Young's first temperament and those of one tuned with equal temperament, when the note A of each scale is assigned the same pitch.

Note	E^{♭}	B^{♭}	F	C	G	D	A	E	B	F^{♯}	C^{♯}	G^{♯}
Difference from equal temperament	+4.0	+6.0	+6.1	+6.2	+4.2	+2.1	0	−2.1	−2.0	−1.8	+0.1	+2.1
Difference from equal temperament	All number values are in musical cents.											

== Second temperament ==
In the second temperament, Young (1802) made each of the fifths F♯-C♯, C♯-G♯, G♯-E♭, E♭-B♭, B♭-F, and F-C perfectly just, while the fifths C-G, G-D, D-A, A-E, E-B, and B-F♯ are each 1/6 of a Pythagorean (ditonic) comma narrower than just. The exact and approximate numerical sizes of these latter fifths, in cents, are given by:

f_{4} = 2600 − 1200 log_{2}( 3 ) ≈ 698.04

If f_{3} and s_{3} are the same as in the previous section, and s_{4} f_{4} − 600 , the sizes of the major thirds in the temperament are as given in the second row of the following table:

Major third	C-E, G-B, D-F♯	A-C♯, F-A	E-G♯, B♭-D	B-E♭, E♭-G	F♯-B♭, C♯-F; G♯-C
Width exact approx.	4 s_{4} 392.18	3 s_{4} + s_{3} 396.09	2 s_{4} + 2 s_{3} 400 (exactly)	s_{4} + 3 s_{3} 403.91	4 s_{3} 407.82
Deviation from just	+5.9	+9.8	+13.7	+17.6	+21.5

The following table gives the pitch differences in cents between the notes of a chromatic scale tuned with Young's second temperament and those of one tuned with equal temperament, when the note A of each scale is given the same pitch.

Note	E♭	B♭	F	C	G	D	A	E	B	F♯	C♯	G♯
Difference from equal temperament	0	+2.0	+3.9	+5.9	+3.9	+2.0	0	-2.0	-3.9	-5.9	-3.9	-2.0

Young's 2nd temperament is very similar to the Vallotti temperament which also has six consecutive pure fifths and six tempered by 1/6 of a Pythagorean comma. Young's temperament is shifted one note around the circle of fifths, with the first tempered fifth beginning on C instead of F. For this reason it is sometimes called "Vallotti-Young" or "shifted Vallotti".

== Sources ==
- Barbour, James Murray (2004) [1951]. Tuning and Temperament: A historical survey. Minneola, NY: Dover Publications. ISBN 978-0-486-43406-3.
- Donahue, Thomas (2005). A Guide to Musical Temperament. Lanham, MD: Scarecrow Press. ISBN 978-0-8108-5438-3.
- Jorgensen, Owen (1991). Tuning. East Lansing, MI: Michigan State University Press. ISBN 978-0-87013-290-2. "Containing the perfection of eighteenth-century temperament, the lost art of nineteenth-century temperament, and the science of equal-temperament, complete with instructions for aural and electronic tuning."
- Young, Thomas (1800). "Outlines of experiments and inquiries respecting sound and light in a letter to Edward Whitaker Gray, M.D. Sec. R.S." Philosophical Transactions of the Royal Society of London. 90: 106–150. doi:10.1098/rstl.1800.0008.
- Young, Thomas (1802). "Outlines of experiments and inquiries respecting sound and light". Journal of Natural Philosophy, Chemistry and the Arts. 5: 72-78, 81-91, 121-130, 167.
- Young, Thomas (1807). A Course of Lectures on Natural Philosophy and the Mechanical Arts. Vol. 2. London, UK: Joseph Johnson.
