= Edward Kottick =

Edward (Leon) Kottick (June 16th, 1930-December 6th, 2025) was a musician who served as a musicology professor at the University of Iowa in Iowa City.

== Biography ==
Kottick gave the outline facts of his life on his website:

"I was born in Jersey City, NJ, in 1930, and was brought up in Brooklyn, NY, where I studied the trombone. I later became a music major at NYU. Following two years in the army, where I conducted a band, I went to New Orleans, LA, to play in the symphony; but after a few years of that I decided to go to graduate school at Tulane University, where I was introduced to musicology and renaissance music. The combination made a deep impression on me, and after my MA I went to the University of North Carolina for my PhD. (It was there that I saw my first kit harpsichord.) I continued to play the trombone, which helped me support my wife and two daughters, but by this time I had become a dedicated musicologist. After a series of teaching posts around the midwest I ended up at the University of Iowa, where I have happily remained ever since. I ran the collegium musicum at Iowa for many years, and also played recorder in a baroque trio ensemble. I retired from teaching in 1992."

In his years since retiring, Kottick was active as a scholar and as a harpsichord builder. He also served as an agent for the Zuckermann harpsichord firm.

== Harpsichord scholarship ==
Kottick is the author of three books about the harpsichord.

- The Harpsichord Owner's Guide: A Manual for Buyers and Owners (1987)
- Early Keyboard Instruments in European Museums, (1997) coauthored with George Lucktenberg
- A History of the Harpsichord (2003)

Kottick's journal publications include work on harpsichord acoustics.

== Honors ==
In 2006 he received the Curt Sachs Award from the American Musical Instrument Society, noting his "distinguished work as a scholar, author, lecturer, builder, and designer."

== Bibliography ==
- (1967, ed.) The unica in the Chansonnier cordiforme (Paris, Bibliothéque nationale, Rothschild 2973). American Institute of Musicology.
- (1974) Tone and intonation on the recorder. New York : McGinnis & Marx.
- (1977) The collegium: a handbook. Stonington, Conn. : October House, c1977.
- (1987) The harpsichord owner's guide : a manual for buyers and owners. Chapel Hill : University of North Carolina Press.
- (1997) Edward Kottick and George Lucktenberg, Early keyboard instruments in European museums. Bloomington, Ind. : Indiana University Press.
- (2003) A history of the harpsichord. Bloomington, Ind. : Indiana University Press.

For a listing of journal articles see .
