= Vallotti temperament =

Slightly modified version of a circulating temperament

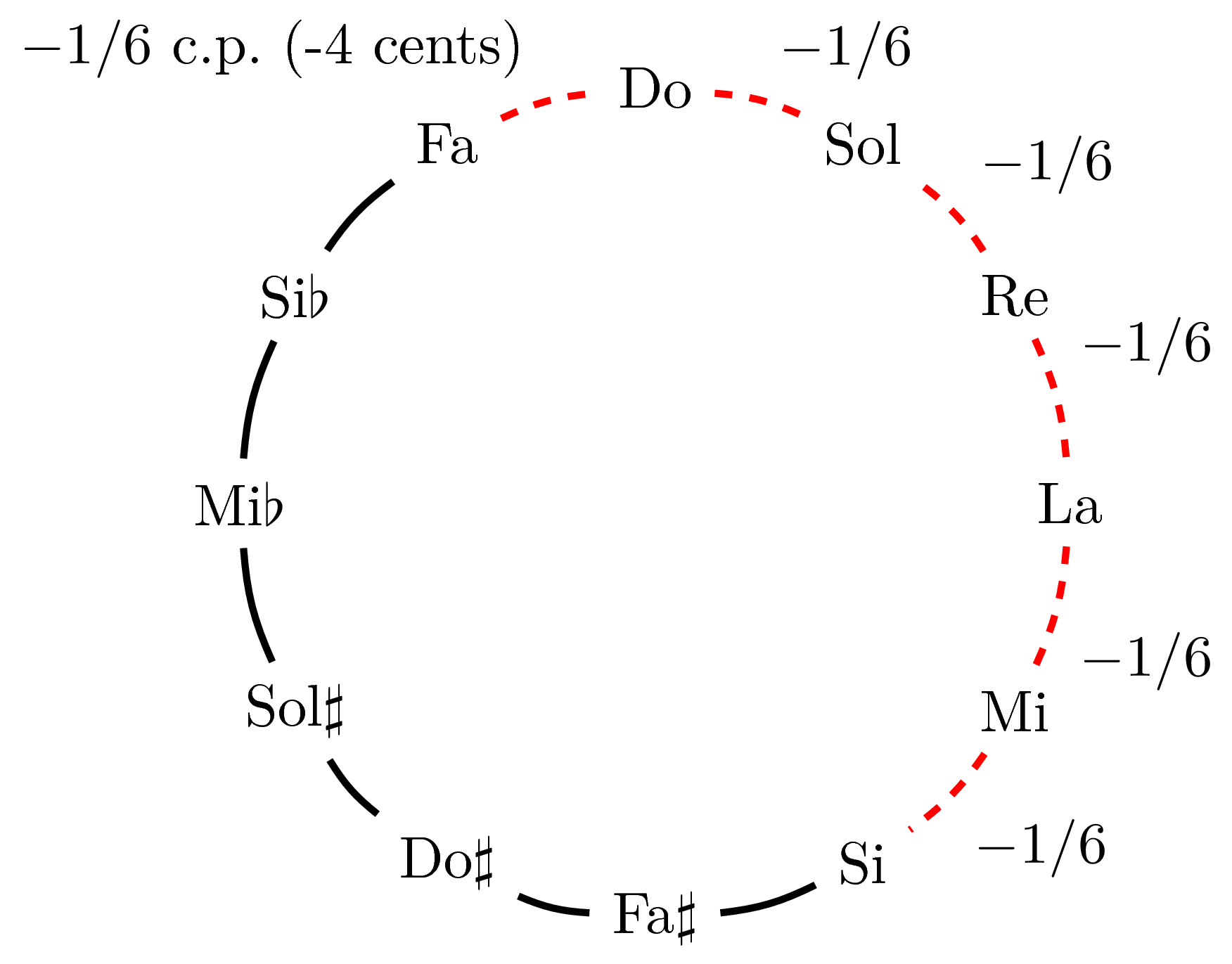
Círculo de quintas correspondiente al temperamento de Vallotti de 1/6 de coma, según Tartini.

The circulating temperament today referred to as Vallotti temperament (or simply Vallotti, Vallotti-Barca, Vallotti-Tartini, or Vallotti-Young) is a shifted version of Young's second temperament. Its attribution to the 18th-century organist, composer, and music theorist, Francesco Vallotti is a mistake, since there is no evidence that he ever suggested it. It is however audibly indistinguishable from a slightly different temperament that was in fact devised by Vallotti.

Vallotti's description of his temperament appears in book 2 of his treatise, Della scienza teorica e pratica della moderna musica (On the theoretical and practical science of modern music). Although he stated that he had developed his theoretical system—presumably including the details of his temperament—by 1728, the first book of his treatise was not published until 1779, the year before he died. At the time of his death, the other three books had not been published, and remained only in manuscript form until an edition of all four books was published in 1950, under the title Trattato della moderna musica (Treatise on modern music).

Vallotti's temperament received very little attention during his lifetime and for some time thereafter. In a treatise published in 1754, Vallotti's friend and colleague Giuseppe Tartini praised the former's approach to temperament, and outlined some of its features, but without giving sufficient detail for the temperament itself to be identified. In 1781, the mathematician William Jones noted Tartini's preference for Vallotti's temperament and gave a similarly vague and unspecific description.

The temperament originally devised by Vallotti has six fifths tempered by 1/6 of a syntonic comma, five perfectly just, and one tempered by a schisma. In a manuscript which remained unpublished until 1987, the Italian chemist and musical theorist, Alessandro Barca, proposed that this latter fifth be widened by 5/6 of a schisma, and all the pure fifths be narrowed by 1/6 of a schisma. Barca's version thus has six fifths tempered by 1/6 of a syntonic comma, and six tempered by 1/6 of a schisma. In the temperament now commonly misattributed to Vallotti, the odd fifth out in his original is widened by a full schisma, and each of the six tempered fifths is narrowed by a further 1/6 of a schisma. This modern version thus has six fifths tempered by 1/6 of a Pythagorean comma, and six perfectly just. More recently, Owen Jorgensen has proposed a version of Vallotti's temperament in which the beating frequencies of the tempered fifths, rather than their sizes, are chosen to be equal. In practice, none of these four versions is audibly distinguishable from any of the others, because no interval in any of them differs from the corresponding interval in any of the other three by more than two cents.

== Description ==
In the circulating temperament today commonly misattributed to Vallotti, each of the fifths B-F♯, F♯-C♯, C♯-G♯, G♯-E♭, E♭-B♭, and B♭-F are perfectly just, while the fifths F-C, C-G, G-D, D-A, A-E, and E-B are each 1/6 of a Pythagorean (ditonic) comma narrower than just. The exact and approximate numerical sizes of these fifths, in cents, are given by:

f_{1}	1200 ( log_{2}(3) − 1) ≈ 701.96	(perfectly just)
f_{2}	2600 − 1200 log_{2}(3) ≈ 698.04	(narrower than just by 1/6 of a ditonic comma)

If s_{j} f_{j} − 600 for j = 1,2, the sizes of the major thirds in this temperament are:

Major third	F-A, C-E, G-B	D-F♯, B♭-D	A-C♯, E♭-G	E-G♯, G♯-C	B-E♭, F♯-B♭, C♯-F
Width exact approx.	4 s_{2} 392.18	3 s_{2} + s_{1} 396.09	2 s_{2} + 2 s_{1} 400 (exactly)	s_{2} + 3 s_{1} 403.91	4 s_{1} 407.82
Deviation from just	+5.9	+9.8	+13.7	+17.6	+21.5

The following table gives the pitch differences in cents between the notes of a chromatic scale tuned with this temperament and those of one tuned with equal temperament, when the note A of each scale is given the same pitch.

Note	E♭	B♭	F	C	G	D	A	E	B	F♯	C♯	G♯
Difference from equal temperament	+3.9	+5.9	+7.8	+5.9	+3.9	+2.0	0	-2.0	-3.9	-2.0	0	+2.0

This temperament is merely a shifted version of Young's second temperament, which also has six consecutive pure fifths and six tempered by 1/6 of a Pythagorean comma. In Young's second temperament, however, the sequence of tempered fifths starts from the note C, rather than from F, as they do in the temperament today commonly misattributed to Vallotti.

== Other versions ==
=== Vallotti's original ===
In the original description of his temperament, Vallotti made each of the fifths B-F♯, F♯-C♯, C♯-G♯, G♯-E♭, and E♭-B♭ perfectly just, just as in the modern version, but rather than making the fifths F-C, C-G, G-D, D-A, A-E, and E-B narrower than just by a 1/6 of a Pythagorean comma, he had narrowed them by only 1/6 of a syntonic comma. This left the remaining fifth, B♭-F, narrower than just by a schisma. The exact and approximate numerical sizes of these latter fifths, in cents, are given by:

f_{3}	200 ( 2 log_{2}(3) + log_{2}(5) – 2 ) ≈ 698.37	(narrower than just by 1/6 of a syntonic comma)
f_{4}	1200 ( 14 – 7 log_{2}(3) – log_{2}(5) ) ≈ 700.00	(narrower than just by a schisma)

If s_{1} is defined as above, and s_{j} f_{j} − 600 for j = 3,4, the sizes of the major thirds in this temperament are:

Major third	F-A, C-E, G-B	D-F♯	A-C♯	E-G♯	B-E♭, F♯-B♭	C♯-F	G♯-C	E♭-G	B♭-D
Width exact approx.	4 s_{3} 393.48	3 s_{3} + s_{1} 397.07	2 s_{3} + 2 s_{1} 400.65	s_{3} + 3 s_{1} 404.24	4 s_{1} 407.82	s_{4} + 3 s_{1} 405.87	s_{3} + s_{4} + 2 s_{1} 402.28	2 s_{3} + s_{4} + s_{1} 398.70	3 s_{3} + s_{4} 395.11
Deviation from just	+7.2	+10.8	+14.3	+17.9	+21.5	+19.6	+16.0	+12.4	+8.8

The following table gives the pitch differences in cents between the notes of a chromatic scale tuned with this temperament and those of one tuned with equal temperament, when the note A of each scale is given the same pitch.

Note	E♭	B♭	F	C	G	D	A	E	B	F♯	C♯	G♯
Difference from equal temperament	+4.6	+6.5	+6.5	+4.9	+3.3	+1.6	0	-1.6	-3.3	-1.3	+0.65	+2.6

=== Barca's suggested modification ===
In an 18th-century work, which remained unpublished until 1987, Alessandro Barca suggested that the schisma discrepancy which Vallotti had left to fall entirely in the single fifth, B♭-F, be instead spread amongst the six fifths B-F♯, F♯-C♯, C♯-G♯, G♯-E♭, E♭-B♭, and B♭-F, thus making them each narrower than just by the negligible quantity 1/6 of a schisma (about 1/3 of a cent). The exact and approximate numerical size of these fifths, in cents, is given by:

f_{5}	200 ( 9 – 2 log_{2}(3) – log_{2}(5) ) ≈ 701.63	(narrower than just by 1/6 of a schisma)

If s_{3} is defined as above, and s_{5} f_{5} − 600, the sizes of the major thirds in this temperament are:

Major third	F-A, C-E, G-B	D-F♯, B♭-D	A-C♯, E♭-G	E-G♯, G♯-C	B-E♭, F♯-B♭, C♯-F
Width exact approx.	4 s_{3} 393.48	3 s_{3} + s_{5} 396.74	2 s_{3} + 2 s_{5} 400 (exactly)	s_{3} + 3 s_{5} 403.26	4 s_{5} 406.52
Deviation from just	+7.2	+10.4	+13.7	+16.9	+20.2

The following table gives the pitch differences in cents between the notes of a chromatic scale tuned with this temperament and those of one tuned with equal temperament, when the note A of each scale is given the same pitch.

Note	E♭	B♭	F	C	G	D	A	E	B	F♯	C♯	G♯
Difference from equal temperament	+3.3	+4.9	+6.5	+4.9	+3.3	+1.6	0	-1.6	-3.3	-1.6	0	+1.6

=== Jorgensen's version with equal-beating fifths ===
One of the leading experts on keyboard construction and tuning, Owen Jorgensen, contended that tempering fifths by precisely the same amount on keyboards—with the possible exception of the organ—was beyond the capabilities of tuning practices used before the twentieth century, and that the vast majority of keyboard tuners, when tuning by ear before the development of twentieth century tuning techniques, would have judged two adjacent or overlapping fifths to be the same whenever they beat at the same rate. (Note: Jorgensen (1991, pp.44, 310). Sturm (2011) and Di Veroli (2013, pp.146-48) have dismissed these contentions of Jorgensen's as unfounded speculation.)

Jorgensen gave two sets of instructions for tuning Valotti's temperament in a way which he considered representative of what he believed would have been the results achieved by 18th- and 19th-century tuners. The first used a bearing plan for the octave F_{3} to F_{4}, the second, a bearing plan for the higher octave, F_{4} to F_{5}. In the first, middle C (C_{4}) is tuned to a standard pitch of 220 ^{4}√2 Hz, all octaves, and the fifths B–F♯, F♯–C♯, C♯–G♯, E♭–B♭ and B♭–F are tuned just, while the fifths F_{3}–C_{4}, C_{3}–G_{3}, G_{3}–D_{4}, D_{3}–A_{3}, A_{3}–E_{4}, and E_{3}–B_{3} are tuned narrow, all with a beat rate of 1.1 Hz. The amounts by which these tempered fifths are narrow range from 2.9 cents for A–E to 4.9 cents for C–G, and average to 3.8 cents, slightly less than a sixth of the Pythagorean comma. As a consequence, the diminished sixth G♯–E♭, which is required to be a perfectly just fifth in Vallotti proper, turns out to be tempered narrow by 0.6 cents in this version of Jorgensen's. The sizes of its major thirds in cents are:

Major third	F-A	C-E	G-B	D-F♯	A-C♯	E-G♯	B-E♭, F♯-B♭, C♯-F	G♯-C	E♭-G	B♭-D
Width (approx.)	391.74	392.48	393.46	396.71	401.05	403.95	407.21	403.58	399.32	396.08
Deviation from just	+5.4	+6.2	+7.1	+10.4	+14.7	+17.6	+20.9	+17.3	+13.0	+9.8

The following table gives the pitch differences in cents between the notes of a chromatic scale tuned with Jorgensen's equal-beating version of Vallotti temperament and those of one tuned with equal temperament, when the note C_{4} of each scale is given the same pitch, 220 ^{4}√2 Hz.

Note	E♭	B♭	F	C	G	D	A	E	B	F♯	C♯	G♯
Difference from equal temperament	-2.2	-0.3	+1.7	0	-2.9	-4.2	-6.6	-7.5	-9.4	-7.5	-5.5	-3.5
