= Split sharp =

Keyboard key divided in two

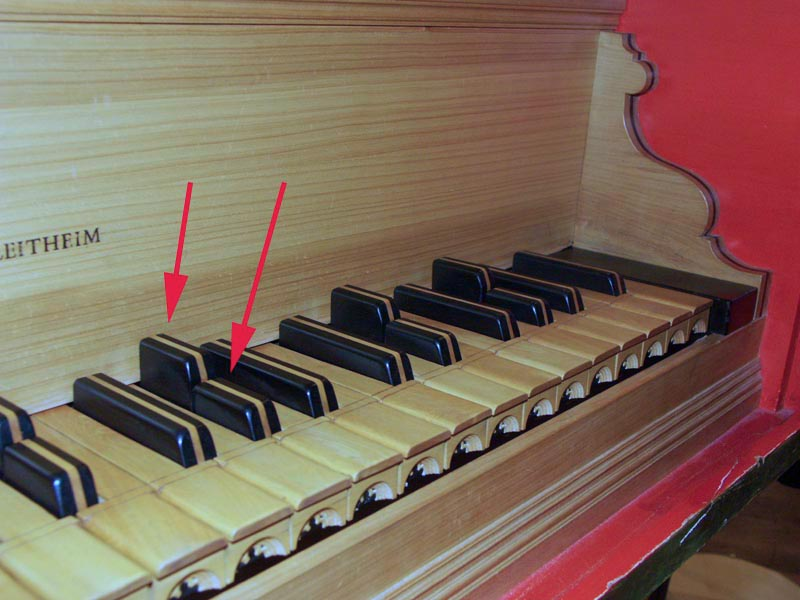
The keyboard of a harpsichord by Bernhard von Tucher (Germany). The keyboard has "divided black keys" in order to tune the instrument in two different keys (in meantone temperament).

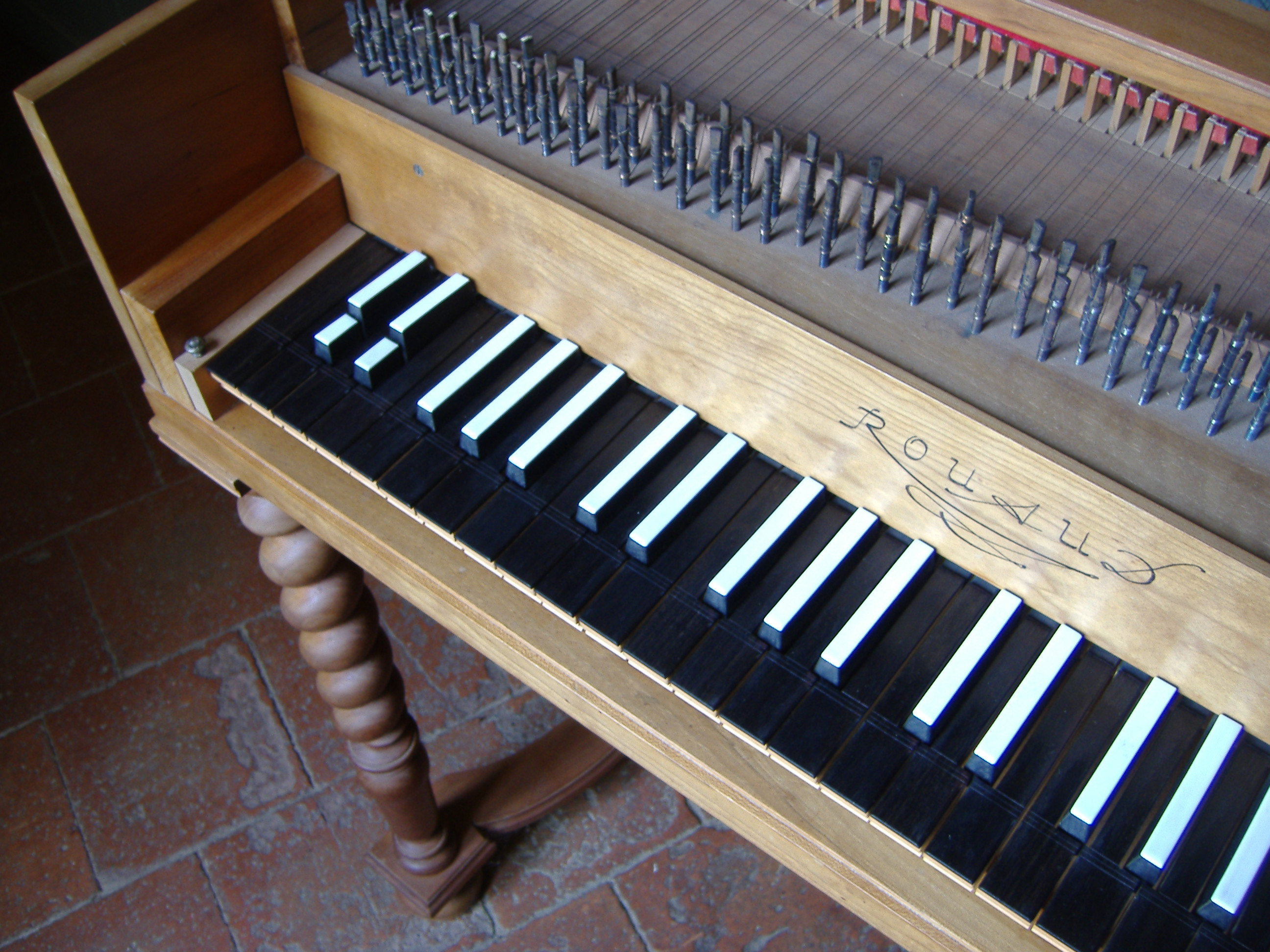
In this harpsichord built by Clavecins Rouaud of Paris, the two lowest sharps are split, following the broken octave scheme.

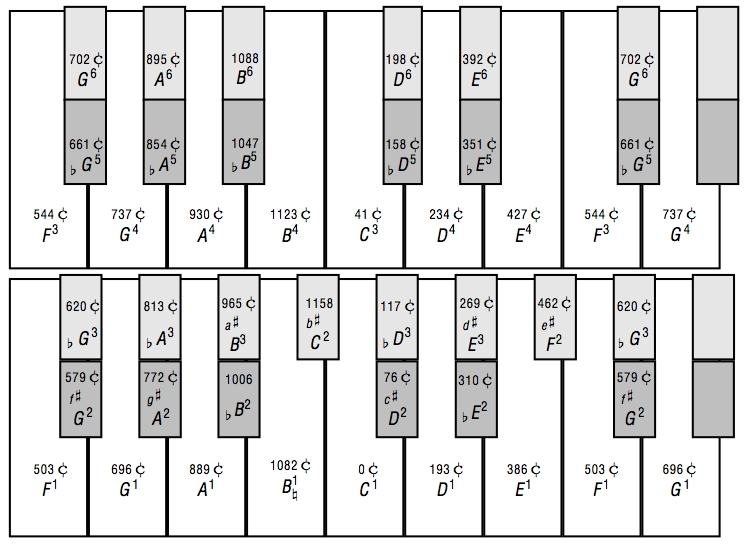
Archicembalo keyboard in cents.

A split sharp is a kind of key found in some early keyboard instruments, such as the harpsichord, clavichord, or organ. It is a musical key divided in two, with separately depressible front and back sections, each sounding its own pitch. The particular keys that were split were those that play the sharps and flats on the standard musical keyboard (the "black keys" on a modern piano).

Split sharp. A sharp key divided or 'split' into two parts: the front part is about one third the length of the whole. Usually the back part is set slightly higher to facilitate playing. Each part has its own [parts] so that two notes are available. In Italian instruments it was common...to provide split sharps for e♭/d♯ and g♯/a♭. The usual practice was to put on the front part the note that would normally be found there, e.g. e♭ and g♯.

Split sharps served two distinct purposes. First, in the broken octave, they allowed an instrument to include deep bass notes while retaining a short, compact keyboard.

Second, in older music, tuning was generally not done by equal temperament, which treats note pairs such as A♯ and B♭ as the same pitch. Instead, they were assigned slightly different pitches on enharmonic keyboards (particularly in "meantone temperament"). This allowed certain musical intervals, such as the major third, to sound closer to their ideal just value, hence more closely tuned to just intonation. (Note: For a recent defense of the older tuning practices, see Duffin, Ross (2006) How Equal Temperament Ruined Harmony (and Why You Should Care) W.W. Norton & Co. ISBN 0-393-06227-9.)

Split sharps present advantages and disadvantages: "Obviously this would have its advantages under some circumstances in terms of intonation. However, the complexities of fingering and hand position dictated by such a keyboard configuration presented problems." Specifically: "Such devices were obviously an impediment to rapid scale work in the lowest bass register, but this does not matter greatly as Italian seventeenth-century music generally avoids writing of this kind."

In modern usage, split sharps are usually the method of choice for custom keyboards that play 19 equal temperament, which, like meantone, uses different pitches for sharps and flats that are enharmonic in the standard 12 tone.
