= Archicembalo =

Musical instrument

Reproduction of the archicembalo

The archicembalo /ɑːrkiˈtʃɛmbəloʊ/ (or arcicembalo, /ɑːrtʃiˈtʃɛmbəloʊ/) was a musical instrument described by Nicola Vicentino in 1555. This was a harpsichord built with many extra keys and strings, enabling experimentation in microtonality and just intonation.

== Construction ==
The archicembalo had two manuals, but unlike those on a normal harpsichord these two keyboards were used to provide extra pitches rather than a timbral difference. Both manuals contained all of the usual white and black keys, but in addition each black key was divided into two parts so that a distinction could be made between a sharp or flat note. The lower manual also included black keys between B and C, and between E and F. In total, 36 keys were available in any octave, each of which was tuned to a different pitch, as shown in the diagram of the lower manual.

== Tuning ==
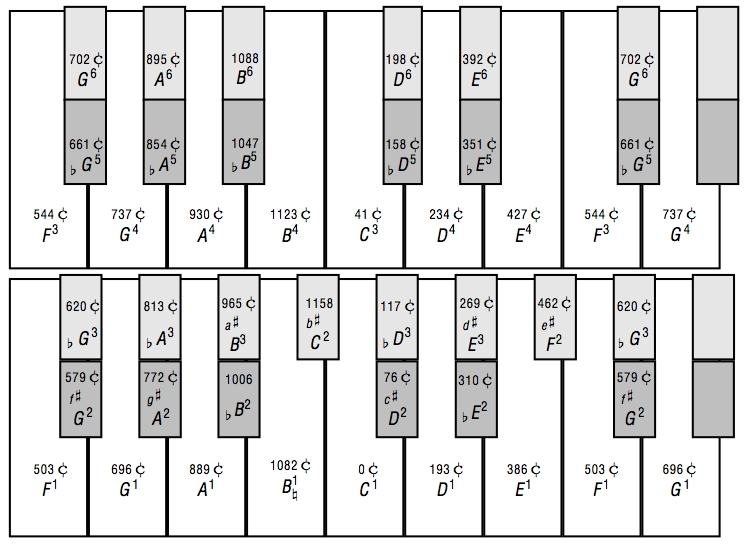
Diagram of the archicembalo's tuning in cents.

There were two systems of tuning the archicembalo considered by Vicentino:

1. The most important was the extended quarter-comma meantone temperament—which, given such a wide gamut of fifths, becomes almost exactly a system of 31 equal divisions of the octave (see 31 equal temperament). This arises because after a cycle of 31 quarter-comma-tempered fifths, the 32nd pitch is remarkably close to a pitch that already exists in the system. Thus, five of Vicentino's 36 possibilities became practically redundant in this system. He suggested that these five be tuned instead according to the second manner described below.
2. Vicentino offered an alternative tuning in which the upper keyboard was tuned a quarter-comma higher than the lower, allowing pure fifths by playing chords across the manuals, giving a limited system of triadic just intonation. This tuning still permits modulation to a wide range of keys, but not in a completely circular fashion as with the first tuning described above, and still only modulates by the meantone-tempered fifth, not by the pure fifth.

The observation that extended quarter-comma meantone temperament almost exactly approximates 31 equal was recognized by Huygens in 1661, published in 1691. He says that after making this discovery, he found an earlier mention of the idea in Salinas' report on a 31 tone Italian keyboard, presumably Vicentino's archicembalo.

Vicentino's description of his first tuning has some puzzling statements if it is understood as 31 equal. He says that the major third from C to E is made closer to pure if it uses the slightly lower pitched C on the front keyboard with the slightly higher pitched E from the back keyboard. This is puzzling because in pure 31 equal all the major thirds should have been almost exactly pure already. Karol Berger's analysis of this suggests that he may actually have used a somewhat unequal tuning for his extended meantone system, varying perhaps from 0.2 comma smaller than pure to 1/3 comma larger than pure.

== Uses ==
Vicentino used his archicembalo to test his own theories of tuning, and realize the more obscure ancient Greek genera, which had been neglected for centuries. In addition to his experiments, he found it very helpful for accompaniment of vocalists and instrumental players, as it was capable of coping with the subtle intonational differences inherent in musical practice in a way that no keyboard instrument had before.

For composers of the time, the archicembalo made total modulatory freedom a possibility without sacrificing the purity of meantone temperament's just thirds as with 12-tone equal temperament. This was exploited by those who learned to play it, such as Luzzasco Luzzaschi. Contemporary composers had been writing vocal music in a very chromatic style for some time, but it was instruments such as the archicembalo that permitted them to explore the instrumental possibilities of chromaticism with a purity of intonation.

== Spelling and pronunciation ==
Vicentino named his instrument the archicembalo with possible reference to Greek prefix ἀρχι-, which means "major, principal" (as in the word architect). Vicentino's advocate Ercole Bottrigari in his Il Desiderio (1599) also used the spelling 'archicembalo'. In most modern English lexica the same instrument has been called arcicembalo (however, without explanation of this non-authentic spelling), while others use Vicentino's spelling, or offer both as alternatives. The spelling 'archicembalo' is preferred in the English translation of the treatise. German music dictionaries consistently give 'archicembalo' as well as the largest Italian Enciclopedia della musica Ricordi. The German scholar Manfred Cordes, who dedicated the book to Vicentino's music system, rebuilt the historic instrument and made a set of 'live' audio recordings using it, gives archicembalo throughout his book. Another German scholar in his article prefers 'arcicembalo', while at the same time pointing out that Vicentino himself used the prefix arci- in another place, to describe an organ with similar functions called an 'arciorgano', and that the Italian language does not make a hard-and-fast distinction between the two forms.

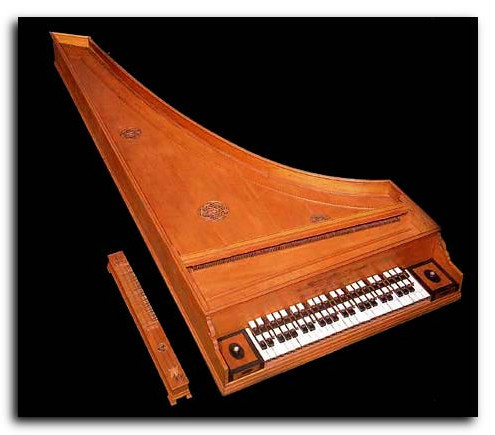
Clavemusicum omnitonum (Vito Trasuntino, Venice 1606) - Bologna, International museum and library of music

== Surviving archicembali ==
Only one keyboard instrument using his 31-note-to-the-octave system survives from the Renaissance: the "Clavemusicum Omnitonum Modulis Diatonicis Cromaticis et Enarmonicis", built by harpsichord maker Vito Trasuntino of Venice (1526 – after 1606) in 1606 intended to play the diatonic, chromatic and enharmonic melodies (moduli). It is on display at the International museum and library of music in Bologna. The Clavemusicum is accompanied by a tuning device, called TRECTA CORDO, that clearly shows an uneven division of the octave, with the usual meantone temperament for the first row of upper keys with C#, Eb, F#, G# and Bb.
