= Julyo =

Italian-born musician, songwriter, producer, DJ

Julyo (Giulio D'Agostino)
- Birth name: Giulio D'Agostino
- Also known as: Julyo
- Born: December 14, 1978 (age 46); Genoa, Italy
- Origin: Italy, Spain
- Genres: Various genres
- Occupation(s): Technologist, Intrapreneur, Music Producer, DJ, VJ
- Instrument(s): Guitar, Bass Guitar, Synthesizer, Piano, Percussions, Sitar, Mandolin, Bouzouki, Citer, Organ, Sampler, Drums
- Years active: 1996 – present
- Labels: EMI Records, Elec-Trip Records, Virgin Records, Avex Group
- Website: www.JulyoMusic.com

Giulio D'Agostino (born in Genoa, Italy on December 14, 1978), better known by the mononym Julyo, is a VJ and DJ. He has several international awards for his work in film scoring and as an intrapreneur for Google LLC, Apple Inc and Salesforce.com. Julyo began his career as a session player, performing for Take That, Dolce & Gabbana, Calvin Klein, Anna Sui, LL Cool J, Cindy Blackman, Michael Brecker, Wizkid, Mika Nakashima, Aphex Twin, B.B. King, Pete Burns (Dead or Alive), Fabrizio de Andre, Lucio Dalla, Lou Reed, Paulo Bragança, Shane MacGowan, Goldie, Reeves Gabrels and Steven Stewart. Since 2003, Julyo has recorded and toured in Europe, the USA, and Japan.

Julyo has been a member of various bands including 4Ever, Kharisma, Photosonic Orchestra, and the British band Kino. Julyo's solo career began in 2006. Julyo won three international awards for his film score to Photosonic, a short film about the 'photosonic guitar' he developed. Julyo has been a member of the ICC Irish Composers Collective. He is also a cultural ambassador for the European Regional Development Fund.

== Biography ==
Early life

Julyo began playing the guitar at the age of 8 and learned Basic, Pascal and Assembly at age 12. Between 1998 and 2000, Julyo took guitar lessons from Japanese guitarist Katsumi Nagaoka, Mick Goodrick, Pat Metheny, performed with Paco De Lucia while he was touring with the Guitar Trio in Europe and played in local bands, one of which was called "Out of Zone." He was influenced by guitarists including Jimi Hendrix, Jeff Beck, Brian May, Jimmy Page, Joe Satriani, and jazz fusion guitarist Pat Metheny. In addition, Julyo attended Nicolo Paganini Conservatory. Julyo has also studied film scoring and music production at Berklee College of Music, with Steve Bates (assistant engineer for Thriller by Michael Jackson), Scott Tarulli, John Finn, Mick Goodrick, John Petrucci and Mark White. After sending a demo CD (initially produced for a Krizia fashion showcase in 1999) to talent agency N.S. Bienstock he began to work as a studio session player for 429 Records and local studios in the US and Europe Between 1999 and 2001, Julyo performed and collaborated with Reeves Gabrels, Jonathan Mover and performed at New York legendary art studios Milk! for Calvin Klein (fashion designer), Museum of Modern Art NYC and Movement Inc. In 2002, Julyo joined Latin pop band '4Ever', performing on electric and nylon strings guitar. During summer 2002, he played the American Anthem at the Fenway Park on electric guitar for a Red Sox game. During his stay in Boston, Massachusetts, Julyo performed regularly at local jam sessions and worked intensively as a studio session player and lead guitar player for the cover band "Howling Devils" (2002 tour live opening act for Mr. Big ). Julyo guitar pieces had been featured extensively in local television and radio stations in Massachusetts from 2001 to 2003. He also worked as session player for LLCoolJ (on the song Fa Ha from the album "10"), DefJam, NBC Television and Cindy Blackman.

Kharisma

In 2003 Julyo relocated to Copenhagen, Denmark, to work as a sound engineer and session player, performing at Rust, Steingaden, Vega, and the Kobenhavn Music Festival 2004 in Rådhuspladsen.

After a brief experience as a session player at TV 2 Zulu and MTV North Europe, Julyo started to perform with a glam-punk-rock band "Kharisma." Kharisma performed a series of short promotional gigs in New York, Munich, Milan, and Amsterdam and released a self-titled EP at the end of 2005. The band became prominent in the Italian and Japanese underground scene between 2003 and 2005, performing along with Japanese rock acts Guitar Wolf and Kokai. After the last tour, Kharisma broke up due to internal tensions. Upon leaving the group, Julyo moved to Tokyo where he performed as VJ in the Japanese underground scene as Photosonic or Photosonik both as performance artist at Kanazawa University, Mori Tower Museum, Tokyo Arts University and as VJ for psytrance and dark techno DJs Talamasca, Skazi and Infected Mushroom.

Photosonic Guitar

During the same period, Julyo started to work on the 'photosonic guitar', a special MIDI guitar instrument used with a custom software developed in Jitter/MAX Smp and a custom OOP language. The 'photosonic guitar' was officially copyrighted in 2005. In 2006, Julyo moved back to Europe to work on a short film about the 'photosonic guitar' in collaboration with Minerva Studios.

Photosonic (short feature)

The movie Photosonic was filmed in Copenhagen, Denmark at Thomas Troelsen Delta Lab studios and at the Minerva Studio with the teamwork of film director Donato Russo, director of photography Søren Bay, makeup artist Anders Lerche, special effects designer Sammy H. Larsen and costume designer Christopher Emborg. The short was screened at a number of film festivals, including Clermont Film Festival (France), the New York Independent Film Festival, the Odense International Film Festival (Denmark), Louis Vuitton Hawaii International Film Festival (Honolulu), Portobello Film Festival (London, England) and the Berkeley Video & Film Festival, Berkeley, CA. Julyo won two awards for Best Score for Photosonic soundtrack, including the 2006 International Award for "Best Music Score" at New York Independent Film Festival for the movie Photosonic and one nomination at the Berkeley Film Festival 2006 for Best Soundtrack. During summer 2007, he collaborated with Laurence Gartel and Ron English as a music composer and performed multi-media shows at Brooklyn Museum, Arlene's Grocery, New York Post Performa Festival.

Photosonik / Photosonic Orchestra

Photosonic Orchestra
- Also known as: Photosonik, GD
- Genres: electronic music, post-folk, world music
- Years active: Duo of Julyo & Vika (2008–2009); Band led by Julyo (2010–present)
- Labels: Various
- Past members: Duo (2008–2009): Giulio "Julyo" D'agostino; Filippo 'Vika' Vicario Band (2010–2011): Giulio "Julyo" D'agostino; Martyna Halas; Reece Wardrop; Steven Conroy

While touring in Japan, Julyo met Italian house music producer Filippo 'Vika' Vicario. Julyo and Vika started to perform as DJ and VJ duo in Tokyo, gaining popularity in the Japanese underground scene as one of the pioneers of 'color-sound music' in the electronic music scene. Encouraged by the increasing popularity of their shows, the duo adopted the pseudonym of 'Photosonik' (later on changed to 'Photosonic Orchestra'), starting a weekly residency at the famous nightclub MOJOs in Roppongi Hills, Tokyo.

During 2008 the Photosonic Orchestra performed extensively in Europe along with DJ Cheeba, and during the same year, Julyo started a ten years residency at the Village as DJ and VJ. Julyo and Vika released the LP 'Anaglyph' and the EP 'Symphony V.2' during 2009 for Elec-Trip Records. The duo performed a mini-tour in Asia and released remixes for EMI Records, Cut Bit Motorz, Juma, DXR Records, and Elec-Trip Records. In late 2009 due to health problems, Vika left the Photosonic Orchestra and relocated to Berlin, Germany. Julyo decided to keep the band name as Photosonic Orchestra and get Polish singer Martyna Halas, Irish drummer Reece Wardrop and bass player Steven Conroy in the band lineup. The band's new lineup played their first gig together at the Body & Soul Festival 2010. After playing a set of gigs in Dublin, they won the Dublin finale of the Guinness Our Thursdays contest.

In April 2011, the Photosonic Orchestra was nominated as Best Live Act at the IDMA Irish Dance Music Awards 2011. Shortly after, the band participated in Dublin's Got Talent 2011, classifying them as finalists. The band broke up in late 2011 and reunited during 2014 with a completely new lineup under the name "Julyo & the Photosonic Orchestra," opening for Vinicio Capossela and performing at several national music festivals in Ireland.

Solo

After the break-up of Photosonic Orchestra, Julyo moved back, focusing on his solo career, in particular doing gigs as DJ, VJ, and guitar player. Thanks to a series of sold-out gigs with Goldie, Gaudi (musician), Ed Solo and Alex M.O.R.P.H. the reputation as VJ was consolidated, and by the end of 2011, Julyo became a quite a name in the Dublin and London underground music scene also because of his residencies as VJ at SeOne and The Village (music venue). Julyo has celebrated the 4th year as resident DJ and VJ at Dublin's famous weekly live music night, the King Kong Club (Whelan's), performing every week as DJ and VJ at the Dublin infamous battle-of-the-bands night along with hosts Keiron Campbell (Amazing Few), rapper Anti-One and DJ Saul Delmore Philbin Bowman.

In 2014 Julyo was elected as Ambassador for European Culture by the European Development Fund, performing at Danube Palace, Irish Georgian Society, Rockwood Music Hall, Vigadó Concert Hall and several European opera theatres, large concert halls, and cultural institutions.

In 2021 the album EPs "Guitar" (2014) and "Mediterraneo" (2016) became certified platinum in Hungary, Bulgaria, and Portugal, along with several other instrumental recordings released between 2008 and 2016, reaching the Top 10 in the iTunes World Charts of several European countries.

Various co-operations and works

Julyo has been in ambient music records like Airports (2007, with Keith Patchel) and "Piazzale Mauna" (2019, Il Sognatore) and in pop music with bands like The Sumerians (with Michael Maccini), and in Kino (UK rock band) and in The Radiant' (with Mark Mangold). He also scored in nationally broadcast TV and radio commercials, including Coca-Cola's "Cappy" commercial and D&G fashion showcases, and contributed to feature films such as Laurence Gartel's Fetish America and Lars Gerhard's Erika Stone documentary. In addition to his work in the music industry as a music publisher and music producer, Julyo is the CEO of digital media company Memetics Ireland Ltd. and has tested and developed apps for Canadian company InteraXon, Inc. and IBVA Technologies. Julyo has released several books on cybersecurity, meditation training, and digital marketing and is a voting member of the Grammy Academy. Between 2009 and 2014, Julyo has collaborated with Marcello Abate, CEO of Kammamuri company in Dublin, for the Vinicio Capossela and Franco Battiato concerts at Button Factory and the Kammamuri Nite events at Grand Social venue.

Julyo has also recorded and toured with Johnny Cragg (Space Hog), Cindy Blackman, Armando Corsi (Paco de Lucia), Mike Mangini (Steve Vai, Extreme), Mark Mangold (Cher, Michael Bolton), Michael Maccini (Simple Minds), Nick Seymour (Crowded House), Graham Hopkins, and Keith Patchel (Television).

== Personal life ==
Julyo has collaborated and worked with Ron English, Gerald Edelman, Cristiano De André, David Lynch Foundation, Edoardo Sanguineti, Paulo Bragança, and Arthur C. Clarke. He has done beta testing for portable EEG devices developed by Interaxon Canada and pioneered brain wave music with Masahiro Kahata and Forward Motion Theatre NYC.

== Discography ==
- Cativo (Paulo Bragança, 2018)

(selective albums)

- Music for Fashion (Muzak (brand))

(selective albums)

- Anaglyph (as part of "Photosonic Orchestra") released by Elec Trip Records (EMI)
- Symphony V.2 (EP) (as part of "Photosonic Orchestra")
- Mystero (EP)
- C.O.T.U. (EP)
- Acoustic Extravaganza (EP)
- Mandolin Concerto (Vivaldi) (EP) with Tokyo Philharmonic Orchestra
- Guitar (LP)

== Filmography ==
- 2006: Photosonic (short) (Screenwriter / Actor / Music score)
- 2013: "Fukushame" (Music score)

== Awards and nominations ==
- In 2002, C. F. Martin & Company Wall of Fame for EP "Conversations"
- In 2006, Julyo won the International Award for Best Music Score at New York Film Festival in for the movie Photosonic. He was also nominated for the Best Music Video at Berkley Film Festival in 2009 for the same movie.
- In 2011, he was nominated for "Best Live Act" at the IDMA Irish Dance Music Awards for his band Photosonic Orchestra.
