= 53 equal temperament =

Musical tuning system of 53 pitches

Figure 1: 53 TET on the syntonic temperament's tuning continuum at 701.89 cents, from Milne, Sethares & Plamondon (2007)

In music, 53 equal temperament, called 53 TET, 53 EDO, or 53 ET, is the tempered scale derived by dividing the octave into 53 equal steps (equal frequency ratios). Each step represents a frequency ratio of 2^{1 ∕ 53} , or 22.6415 cents, an interval sometimes called the Holdrian comma.

53 TET is a tuning of equal temperament in which the tempered perfect fifth is 701.89 cents wide, as shown in Figure 1, and sequential pitches are separated by 22.642 cents.

The 53-TET tuning equates to the unison, or tempers out, the intervals ( 32 805 )/( 32 768 ), known as the schisma, and ( 15 625 )/( 15 552 ), known as the kleisma. These are both 5 limit intervals, involving only the primes 2, 3, and 5 in their factorization, and the fact that 53 TET tempers out both characterizes it completely as a 5 limit temperament: It is the only regular temperament tempering out both of these intervals, or commas, a fact which seems to have first been recognized by Japanese music theorist Shohé Tanaka. Because it tempers these out, 53 TET can be used for both schismatic temperament, tempering out the schisma, and Hanson temperament (also called kleismic), tempering out the kleisma.

The interval of 7 / 4 is closest to the 43rd note (counting from 0) and 2^{43 ∕ 53} = 1.7548 is only 4.8 cents sharp from the harmonic 7th = 7 / 4 in 53 TET, and using it for 7-limit harmony means that the septimal kleisma, the interval 225 / 224 , is also tempered out.

== History and use ==
Theoretical interest in this division goes back to antiquity. Jing Fang (78–37 BCE), a Chinese music theorist, observed that a series of 53 just fifths ( [ 3 / 2 ]^{53} ) is very nearly equal to 31 octaves (2^{31}). He calculated this difference with six-digit accuracy to be ( 177 147 )/( 176 776 ). Later the same observation was made by the mathematician and music theorist Nicholas Mercator (c. 1620–1687), who calculated this value precisely as 3^{53} / 2^{84} = ( 19 383 245 667 680 019 896 796 723 )/( 19 342 813 113 834 066 795 298 816 ), which is known as Mercator's comma. Mercator's comma is of such small value to begin with ( ≈ 3.615 cents), but 53 equal temperament flattens each fifth by only 1/ 53 of that comma ( ≈ 0.0682 cent ≈ 1/ 315 syntonic comma ≈ 1/ 344 pythagorean comma). Thus, 53 tone equal temperament is for all practical purposes equivalent to an extended Pythagorean tuning.

After Mercator, William Holder published a treatise in 1694 which pointed out that 53 equal temperament also very closely approximates the just major third (to within 1.4 cents), and consequently 53 equal temperament accommodates the intervals of 5 limit just intonation very well. This property of 53 TET may have been known earlier; Isaac Newton's unpublished manuscripts suggest that he had been aware of it as early as 1664–1665.

=== Music ===
In the 19th century, people began devising instruments in 53 TET, with an eye to their use in playing near-just 5-limit music. Such instruments were devised by R.H.M. Bosanquet and the American tuner J.P. White. Subsequently, the temperament has seen occasional use by composers in the West, and by the early 20th century, 53 TET had become the most common form of tuning in Ottoman classical music, replacing its older, unequal tuning. Arabic music, which for the most part bases its theory on quartertones, has also made some use of it; the Syrian violinist and music theorist Twfiq Al-Sabagh proposed that instead of an equal division of the octave into 24 parts a 24 note scale in 53 TET should be used as the master scale for Arabic music.

Croatian composer Josip Štolcer-Slavenski wrote one piece, which has never been published, which uses Bosanquet's Enharmonium during its first movement, entitled Music for Natur-ton-system. (Note: "Croatian composer Josip Štolcer-Slavenski wrote one piece, which has never been published, which uses Bosanquet's Enharmonium during its first movement, entitled Music for Natur-ton-system".)

Furthermore, General Thompson worked in league with the London-based guitar maker Louis Panormo to produce the Enharmonic Guitar.

== Notation ==
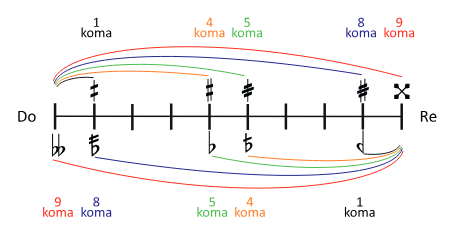
Notation used in Ottoman classical music, where the whole tone is divided into 9 komas.

Standard Western notation, with seven letter-named notes plus sharps and flats, is not adequate to notate music in 53 TET. This is unlike the case with 19 TET and 31 TET where there is little ambiguity. The fact that it is not meantone adds additional problems. Specifically, the Pythagorean major third (ditone) and just major third are distinguished, as are the Pythagorean minor third (semiditone) and just minor third. The fact that the syntonic comma is not tempered out means that notes and intervals need to be defined more precisely. Ottoman classical music uses a notation of flats and sharps for the 9 comma tone.

Furthermore, since 53 is not a multiple of 12, notes such as G♯ and A♭ are not enharmonically equivalent, nor are the corresponding key signatures. As a result, many key signatures will require the use of double sharps (such as G♯ major / E♯ minor), double flats (such as F♭ major / D♭ minor), or microtonal alterations.

Extended pythagorean notation, using only sharps and flats, gives the following chromatic scale:

- C, B♯, A♯, E, D♭, C♯, B, F, E,
- D, C, B♯, F, E♭, D♯, C♯, G, F♭,
- E, D, C/A, G,
- F, E♯, D♯, A, G♭, F♯, E, D/B, A,
- G, F, E♯, B, A♭, G♯, F♯, C, B,
- A, G, F/D, C, B♭, A♯, G♯, D, C♭,
- B, A, G/E, D, C

The note names run out of letters, and quadruple sharps and flats can be required. As a result, a just major 3rd must be spelled as a diminished 4th.

Ups and downs notation keeps the notes in order and also preserves the traditional meaning of sharp and flat. It uses up and down arrows, written as a caret or a lower-case "v", usually in a sans-serif font. One arrow equals one step of 53-TET. In note names, the arrows come first, to facilitate chord naming. The many enharmonic equivalences allow great freedom of spelling.

- C, ^C, ^^C, vvC♯/vD♭, vC♯/D♭, C♯/^D♭, ^C♯/^^D♭, vvD, vD,
- D, ^D, ^^D, vvD♯/vE♭, vD♯/E♭, D♯/^E♭, ^D♯/^^E♭, vvE, vE,
- E, ^E, ^^E/vvF, vF,
- F, ^F, ^^F, vvF♯/vG♭, vF♯/G♭, F♯/^G♭, ^F♯/^^G♭, vvG, vG,
- G, ^G, ^^G, vvG♯/vA♭, vG♯/A♭, G♯/^A♭, ^G♯/^^A♭, vvA, vA,
- A, ^A, ^^A, vvA♯/vB♭, vA♯/B♭, A♯/^B♭, ^A♯/^^B♭, vvB, vB,
- B, ^B, ^^B/vvC, vC, C

=== Chords of 53 equal temperament ===
Since 53-TET is a Pythagorean system, with nearly pure fifths, justly-intonated major and minor triads cannot be spelled in the same manner as in a meantone tuning. Instead, the major triads are chords like C-F♭-G (using the Pythagorean-based notation), where the major third is a diminished fourth; this is the defining characteristic of schismatic temperament. Likewise, the minor triads are chords like C-D♯-G. In 53-TET, the dominant seventh chord would be spelled C-F♭-G-B♭, but the otonal tetrad is C-F♭-G-C, and C-F♭-G-A♯ is still another seventh chord. The utonal tetrad, the inversion of the otonal tetrad, is spelled C-D♯-G-G.

Further septimal chords are the diminished triad, having the two forms C-D♯-G♭ and C-F-G♭, the subminor triad, C-F-G, the supermajor triad C-D-G, and corresponding tetrads C-F-G-B and C-D-G-A♯. Since 53-TET tempers out the septimal kleisma, the septimal kleisma augmented triad C-F♭-B in its various inversions is also a chord of the system. So is the Orwell tetrad, C-F♭-D-G in its various inversions.

Ups and downs notation permits more conventional spellings. Since it also names the intervals of 53 TET, it provides precise chord names too. The pythagorean minor chord with a 32 / 27 third is still named Cm and still spelled C–E♭–G. But the 5-limit upminor chord uses the upminor 3rd 6/5 and is spelled C–^E♭–G. This chord is named C^m. Compare with ^Cm (^C–^E♭–^G).

- Major triad: C-vE-G (downmajor)
- Minor triad: C-^E♭-G (upminor)
- Dominant 7th: C-vE-G-B♭ (down add-7)
- Otonal tetrad: C-vE-G-vB♭ (down7)
- Utonal tetrad: C-^E♭-G-^A (upminor6)
- Diminished triad: C-^E♭-G♭ (updim)
- Diminished triad: C-vE♭-G♭ (downdim)
- Subminor triad: C-vE♭-G (downminor)
- Supermajor triad: C-^E-G (upmajor)
- Subminor tetrad: C-vE♭-G-vA (downminor6)
- Supermajor tetrad: C-^E-G-^B♭ (up7)
- Augmented triad: C-vE-vvG♯ (downaug dud-5)
- Orwell triad: C-vE-vvG-^A (downmajor dud-5 up6)

== Interval size ==
7-Limit just intonation intervals approximated in 53 TET

Because a distance of 31 steps in this scale is almost precisely equal to a just perfect fifth, in theory this scale can be considered a slightly tempered form of Pythagorean tuning that has been extended to 53 tones. As such the intervals available can have the same properties as any Pythagorean tuning, such as fifths that are (practically) pure, major thirds that are wide from just (about 81 / 64 opposed to the purer 5 / 4 , and minor thirds that are conversely narrow ( 32 / 27 compared to 6 / 5 ).

However, 53 TET contains additional intervals that are very close to just intonation. For instance, the interval of 17 steps is also a major third, but only 1.4 cents narrower than the very pure just interval 5 / 4 . 53 TET is very good as an approximation to any interval in 5 limit just intonation. Similarly, the pure just interval 6 / 5 is only 1.3 cents wider than 14 steps in 53 TET.

The matches to the just intervals involving the 7th harmonic are slightly less close (43 steps are 4.8 cents sharp for 7 / 4 ), but all such intervals are still quite closely matched with the highest deviation being the 7 / 5 tritone. The 11th harmonic and intervals involving it are less closely matched, as illustrated by the undecimal neutral seconds and thirds in the table below. 7-limit ratios are colored light gray, and 11- and 13-limit ratios are colored dark gray.

Size (steps)	Size (cents)	Interval name	Nearest Just ratio	Just (cents)	Error (cents)	Limit
53	1200	perfect octave	2 / 1	1200	0	2
52	1177.36	grave octave	160 / 81	1178.49	−1.14	5
51	1154.72	just augmented seventh	125 / 64	1158.94	−4.22	5
50	1132.08	diminished octave	48 / 25	1129.33	+2.75	5
48	1086.79	just major seventh	15 / 8	1088.27	−1.48	5
45	1018.87	just minor seventh	9 / 5	1017.60	+1.27	5
44	996.23	Pythagorean minor seventh	16 / 9	996.09	+0.14	3
43	973.59	acute augmented sixth	225 / 128	976.54	−2.95	5
43	973.59	harmonic seventh	7 / 4	968.83	+4.76	7
43	973.59	acute diminished seventh	2187/ 125	968.43	+5.15	5
42	950.94	just augmented sixth	125 / 72	955.03	−4.09	5
42	950.94	just diminished seventh	216 / 125	946.92	+4.02	5
41	928.30	septimal major sixth	12 / 7	933.13	−4.83	7
40	905.66	Pythagorean major sixth	27 / 16	905.87	−0.21	3
39	883.02	major sixth	5 / 3	884.36	−1.34	5
37	837.73	tridecimal neutral sixth	13 / 8	840.53	−2.8	13
36	815.09	minor sixth	8 / 5	813.69	+1.40	5
31	701.89	perfect fifth	3 / 2	701.96	−0.07	3
30	679.25	grave fifth	40 / 27	680.45	−1.21	5
28	633.96	just diminished fifth (greater tritone)	36 / 25	631.28	+2.68	5
27	611.32	Pythagorean augmented fourth	729 / 512	611.73	−0.41	3
27	611.32	greater ‘classic’ tritone	64 / 45	609.78	+1.54	5
26	588.68	lesser ‘classic’ tritone	45 / 32	590.22	−1.54	5
26	588.68	septimal tritone	7 / 5	582.51	+6.17	7
25	566.04	just augmented fourth (lesser tritone)	25 / 18	568.72	−2.68	5
24	543.40	undecimal major fourth	11 / 8	551.32	−7.92	11
24	543.40	double diminished fifth	512 / 375	539.10	+4.30	5
24	543.40	undecimal augmented fourth	15 / 11	536.95	+6.45	11
23	520.76	acute fourth	27 / 20	519.55	+1.21	5
22	498.11	perfect fourth	4 / 3	498.04	+0.07	3
21	475.47	grave fourth	320 / 243	476.54	−1.07	5
21	475.47	septimal narrow fourth	21 / 16	470.78	+4.69	7
20	452.83	just augmented third	125 / 96	456.99	−4.16	5
20	452.83	tridecimal augmented third	13 / 10	454.21	−1.38	13
19	430.19	septimal major third	9 / 7	435.08	−4.90	7
19	430.19	just diminished fourth	32 / 25	427.37	+2.82	5
18	407.54	Pythagorean ditone	81 / 64	407.82	−0.28	3
17	384.91	just major third	5 / 4	386.31	−1.40	5
16	362.26	grave major third	100 / 81	364.80	−2.54	5
16	362.26	neutral third, tridecimal	16 / 13	359.47	+2.79	13
15	339.62	neutral third, undecimal	11 / 9	347.41	−7.79	11
15	339.62	acute minor third	243 / 200	337.15	+2.47	5
14	316.98	just minor third	6 / 5	315.64	+1.34	5
13	294.34	Pythagorean semiditone	32 / 27	294.13	+0.21	3
12	271.70	just augmented second	75 / 64	274.58	−2.88	5
12	271.70	septimal minor third	7 / 6	266.87	+4.83	7
11	249.06	just diminished third	144 / 125	244.97	+4.09	5
10	226.41	septimal whole tone	8 / 7	231.17	−4.76	7
10	226.41	diminished third	256 / 225	223.46	+2.95	5
9	203.77	whole tone, major tone, greater tone, just second	9 / 8	203.91	−0.14	3
8	181.13	grave whole tone, minor tone, lesser tone, grave second	10 / 9	182.40	−1.27	5
7	158.49	neutral second, greater undecimal	11 / 10	165.00	−6.51	11
7	158.49	doubly grave whole tone	800 / 729	160.90	−2.41	5
7	158.49	neutral second, lesser undecimal	12 / 11	150.64	+7.85	11
6	135.85	acute diatonic semitone	27 / 25	133.24	+2.61	5
5	113.21	greater Pythagorean semitone	( 2 187 )/( 2 048 )	113.69	−0.48	3
5	113.21	just diatonic semitone, just minor second	16 / 15	111.73	+1.48	5
4	90.57	major limma	135 / 128	92.18	−1.61	5
4	90.57	lesser Pythagorean semitone	256 / 243	90.22	+0.34	3
3	67.92	just chromatic semitone	25 / 24	70.67	−2.75	5
3	67.92	greater diesis	648 / 625	62.57	+5.35	5
2	45.28	septimal diesis	36 / 35	48.77	−3.49	7
2	45.28	just diesis	128 / 125	41.06	+4.22	5
1	22.64	syntonic comma	81 / 80	21.51	+1.14	5
0	0	perfect unison	1 / 1	0	0	1

== Scale diagram ==
The following are 21 of the 53 notes in the chromatic scale. The rest can easily be added.

Interval (steps)	3	2	4	3	2	3	2	1	2	4	1	4	3	2	4	3	2	3	2	1	2	
Interval (cents)	68	45	91	68	45	68	45	23	45	91	23	91	68	45	91	68	45	68	45	23	45	
Note name (Pythagorean notation)	C	E	C♯	D	F	D♯	F♭	D	C/A	F	G♭	F♯	G	B	G♯	B	C	A♯	C♭	A	G/E	C
Note name (ups and downs notation)	C	vvC♯/vD♭	C♯/^D♭	D	vvD♯/vE♭	D♯/^E♭	vE	^E	^^E/vvF	F	vF♯/G♭	F♯/^G♭	G	vvG♯/vA♭	G♯/^A♭	vA	vvA♯/vB♭	A♯/^B♭	vB	^B	^^B/vvC	C
Note (cents)	0	68	113	204	272	317	385	430	453	498	589	611	702	770	815	883	974	1018	1087	1132	1155	1200
Note (steps)	0	3	5	9	12	14	17	19	20	22	26	27	31	34	36	39	43	45	48	50	51	53

== Holdrian comma ==
In music theory and musical tuning the Holdrian comma, also called Holder's comma, and rarely the Arabian comma, is a small musical interval of approximately 22.6415 cents, equal to one step of 53 equal temperament, or $\ \sqrt[53]{2\;}\$. The name "comma", however, is technically misleading, since this interval is an irrational number and it does not describe a compromise between intervals of any tuning system. The interval gets the name "comma" because it is a close approximation of several commas, most notably the syntonic comma (21.51 cents), which was widely used as a unit of tonal measurement during Holder's time.

The origin of Holder's comma resides in the fact that the Ancient Greeks (or at least to the Roman Boethius (Note: According to Boethius, Pythagoras' disciple Philolaus of Croton would have said that the tone consisted in two diatonic semitones and a comma; the diatonic semitone consisted in two diaschismata, each formed of two commas.)) believed that in the Pythagorean tuning the tone could be divided in nine commas, four of which forming the diatonic semitone and five the chromatic semitone. If all these commas are exactly of the same size, there results an octave of 5 tones + 2 diatonic semitones, 5 × 9 + 2 × 4 = 53 equal commas. Holder attributes the division of the octave in 53 equal parts to Nicholas Mercator, (Note: "The late Nicholas Mercator, a Modest Person, and a Learned and Judicious Mathematician, in a Manuscript of his, of which I have had a Sight.") who himself had proposed that 1/ 53 part of the octave be named the "artificial comma".

=== Mercator's comma and the Holdrian comma ===
Mercator's comma is a name often used for a closely related interval because of its association with Nicholas Mercator. (Note: Holder (1731) writes that Marin Mersenne had calculated 58 1 / 4 commas in the octave; Mercator "working by the logarithms, finds out but 55, and a little more.") One of these intervals was first described by Jing Fang in 45 BCE. Mercator applied logarithms to determine that $\ \sqrt[55]{2\;}\$ (≈ 21.8182 cents) was nearly equivalent to a syntonic comma of ≈ 21.5063 cents (a feature of the prevalent meantone temperament of the time). He also considered that an "artificial comma" of $\ \sqrt[53]{2\;}\$ might be useful, because 31 octaves could be practically approximated by a cycle of 53 just fifths. Holder, for whom the Holdrian comma is named, favored this latter unit because the intervals of 53 equal temperament are closer to just intonation than to 55 TET. Thus Mercator's comma and the Holdrian comma are two distinct but nearly equal intervals.

== Use in Turkish makam theory ==
The Holdrian comma has been employed mainly in Ottoman/Turkish music theory by Kemal Ilerici, and by the Turkish composer Erol Sayan. The name of this comma is Holder koması in Turkish.

Name of interval	Commas	Cents	Symbol
Koma	1	22.64	F
Bakiye	4	90.57	B
Küçük Mücennep	5	113.21	S
Büyük Mücennep	8	181.13	K
Tanini	9	203.77	T
Artık Aralık (12)	12	271.70	A (12)
Artık Aralık (13)	13	294.34	A (13)

For instance, the Rast makam (similar to the Western major scale, or more precisely to the justly-tuned major scale) may be considered in terms of Holdrian commas:

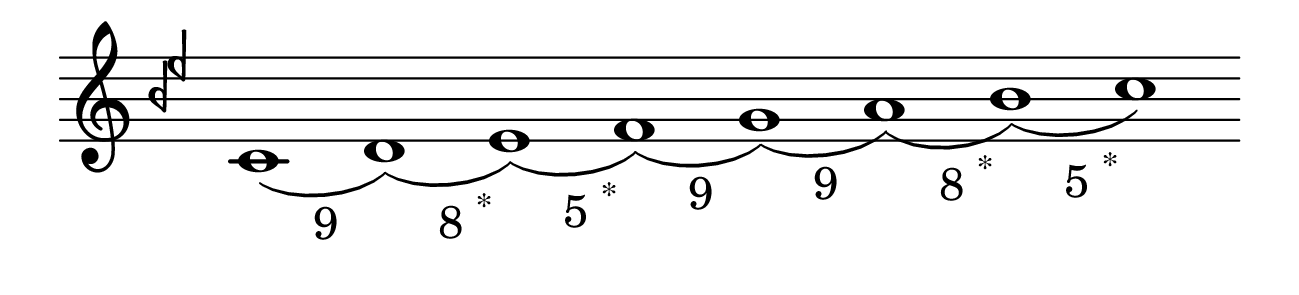

where denotes a Holdrian comma flat, (Note: In common Arabic and Turkish practice, the third note e and the seventh note b in Rast are even lower than in this theory, almost exactly halfway between western major and minor thirds above c and g, i.e. closer to 6.5 commas (three-quarter tone) above d or a and 6.5 below f or c, the thirds c–e and g–b often referred to as a "neutral thirds" by musicologists.) while in contrast, the Nihavend makam (similar to the Western minor scale):

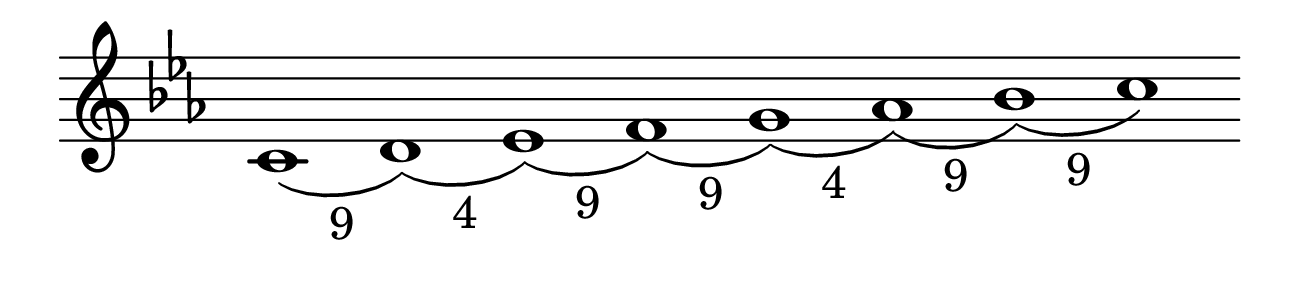

where ♭ denotes a five-comma flat, has medium seconds between d–e♭, e–f, g–a♭, a♭–b♭, and b♭–c′, a medium second being somewhere in between 8 and 9 commas.
