= David Doty =

David Doty may refer to:

- David B. Doty, (born 1950), American composer and authority on just intonation
- David S. Doty (1929–2026), U.S. federal judge
- David Doty (actor), actor in Shades of Ray
