= Alexander Boldachev =

Russian-born composer, arranger, harpist, and teacher

- Александр Болдачёв
- Born: January 21, 1990 (age 36); Saint Petersburg, Russia
- Other name: Sasha Boldachev
- Citizenship: Russian; Swiss
- Education: Saint Petersburg Conservatory; Zurich University of the Arts
- Occupations: Harpist; Composer
- Years active: 1997–present
- Parents: Alexander Vladimirovich Boldachev (father); Irina Sharapova (mother)
- Awards: Aoyama Music Award; ProEuropa; Britain’s Brilliant Prodigies; Kleiner Prix Walo
- Website: alexanderboldachev.com

Alexander Boldachev (Russian: Александр Болдачёв, Russian pronunciation “Boldachov”) (born January 21, 1990), also known as Sasha Boldachev, is a music composer, arranger, teacher and virtuoso harpist. He is based in Zürich, Switzerland. He is a recipient of the 2018 Aoyama Music Award in Japan. Boldachev has received multiple awards for his music in the US, Japan, England, Italy, Switzerland, Belgium, Bulgaria, Russia and France. Boldachev is also a guest soloist at Bolshoi Theatre, Moscow and an official artist of Salvi Harps. He is the founder of the Harp Festival Zurich and holds dual citizenship in Russia and Switzerland.

== Early life and education ==
Boldachev was born in 1990, in Saint Petersburg, Russia, to Irina Sharapova and Alexander Vladimirovich Boldachev. His mother is a professor at Saint Petersburg Conservatory, Merited Artist of the Russian Federation and his father is a philosopher and futurologist, specializing in the blockchain and Semantic System.

Boldachev entered Saint Petersburg Conservatory in 1997 to study the harp under Karina Maleeva and musical composition under Svetlana Lavrova. In 2005, Boldachev moved to Zürich and attended Zurich University of the Arts where he received degrees in harp performance, composition and conducting under Catherine Michel & Sarah O’Brien, Mathias Steinauer & Felix Profos and Marc Kissóczy respectively.

== Career ==
Boldachev started learning piano at an early age of three under the guidance of his mother. He mastered harp and piano by 1996 when he was six years old and composed his first musical piece in the same year. In late 1996, Boldachev started his solo career with a performance at Children's Christmas Festival in Saint Petersburg where he opened the festival with the composition written specially for him by Sergei Slonimsky.

Boldachev had his solo debut with the Lithuanian State Symphony Orchestra in 1999 and performed George Frideric Handel's Harp Concerto in Vilnius. In 2000, he participated in the World Harp Congress and won his first award on Felix Godefroid Harp Competition. In 2001, he began training under French harpist Catherine Michel in Paris. In 2003, Boldachev was awarded by Britain's Brilliant Prodigies, becoming the first non-British contestant to receive this award.

In late 2005, he was awarded with the European Cultural Foundation's Pro Europa - Prize of Culture for his achievements in the field of music and culture. The award was presented by then President of Austria, Heinz Fischer.

Boldachev has performed at numerous international festivals including Burning Man, Gstaad Festival, Spoleto Music Festival, Davos Festival, Festival Musical Olympus, Mozart+, Bravo Award and projects of Moscow International House of Music and Saint Petersburg Music House. Since 2015, he is a member of the jury of the Russian international music competition, Nota Bene.

Boldachev collaborated with Kirill Serebrennikov, a Russian theatre director, in 2016, for the stage play, A Poem Without a Hero as a composer, music director and performer with Alla Demidova at Gogol Center, Moscow.

In 2017, Boldachev became an invited soloist at the Bolshoi Theatre, Moscow and performed at multiple events under the conducting of Tugan Sokhiev including the harp performance during the premiere of the ballet, Nureyev based on Rudolf Nureyev's life. The same year, Boldachev was signed on by Salvi Harps, an Italian manufacturer of concert harps, as their official artist for classical as well as electroacoustic instruments. In 2018, Boldachev performed solo concerts and gave master classes at various European, American and Asian universities including Juilliard School, Royal Academy of Music and The Royal Conservatory of Music.

During 2018 FIFA World Cup opening ceremony, Boldachev shared the stage with Robbie Williams and Aida Garifullina while performing a harp solo of his own composition.

Alexander Boldachev performed with guitarist Alexandr Misko at the 2024 Dutch Harp Festival and their song “Crossroads” was used in the official after movie for the festival.

== Music style and composition ==
Boldachev's style of music is based on the expansion of the harp repertoire with the fusion of classical music and interpretation of popular modern music.

Boldachev has released two solo albums and has contributed to various chamber music albums. He has composed over thirty original harp pieces and transcribed more than a hundred sheet music for harps.

Boldachev associated with the Russian violinist, Alexander Kuznetsov, and formed a music duo, Game of Tones. They were awarded with the Swiss Prix Walo awards in 2015 for their music.

== Discography ==
Year	Title	Credit
2015	The Harp as an Orchestra	Alexander Boldachev
2015	HarpTime Meditation	Alexander Boldachev
2016	Celebration - Alta Duo	Alexander Boldachev and Tania Pimenova
2017	Musical Adventure	Alexander Boldachev & Alexander Kuznetsov
2020	Frédéric	Alexander Boldachev (Frédéric Chopin arranged for Harp)
2021	From Russia with Harp	Alexander Boldachev
2022	Harp Stories	Alexander Boldachev & Bruce Healey
2023	Pop Meets Classical (Vol. 1)	Alexander Boldachev
2024	Zombie (single)	Alexander Boldachev & Alexandr Misko
2025	Credo	Alexander Boldachev

== Recognition ==
Year	Award	Place	Notes
2018	Aoyama Music Foundation Awards	Kyoto, Japan	Prize winner
2015	Kleiner Prix Walo	Zürich, Switzerland	Prize winner
2014	La Fondation d'entreprise Banque Populaire	Paris, France	Prize winner
2011	Concursoiberico Isolda	Madrid, Spain	Laureate
2005	European Cultural Foundation - Pro Europa	Vienna, Austria	Prize winner
2004	Martine Géliot International harp competition	Paris, France	Laureate
2003	The Yuriy Temirkanov Prize	Moscow, Russia	Prize winner
2003	Order of Russian Presidential program – Gifted Children	Saint Petersburg, Russia	Prize winner
2003	Britain's Brilliant Prodigies	London, United Kingdom	Prize winner
2003	UFAM International Music Competition	Paris, France	Laureate
2002	The Lily Laskine International Harp Competition - Junior	Deauville, France	Laureate
2002	Hopes, Talents, Masters	Dobrich, Bulgaria	Laureate
2000	Harp Felix Godefroid Competition	Namur, Belgium	Laureate
