= Aquafina (disambiguation) =

Aquafina is a brand of bottled water products owned by PepsiCo.

Aquafina may also refer to:

== Songs ==
- "Aquafina", a 2015 song by 5ive Mics produced by FKi
- "Aquafina", a 2015 song by Soulja Boy
- "Aquafina", a 2019 song by Lil Peep from Everybody's Everything
- "Aquafina", a 2025 song by Motive

== Media ==
- Sextina Aquafina, a fictional 2014 character from the TV series BoJack Horseman

== See also ==
- Aquafin
- Aquavina, an experimental musical instrument
- Awkwafina (born 1988, as Nora Lum), Asian-American actress and singer
