= Nicholas Mercator =

German mathematician (c.1620 – 1687)

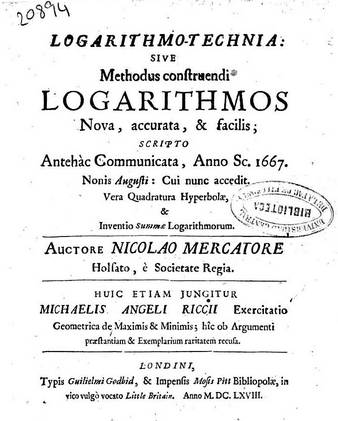

Nicholas (Nikolaus) Mercator (c. 1620, Prince-Bishopric of Lübeck – 1687, Versailles), also known by his German name Kauffmann, was a 17th-century mathematician.

He was born in Eutin, Prince-Bishopric of Lübeck, Holy Roman Empire and educated at Rostock and Leyden after which he lived from 1642 to 1648 in the Dutch Republic. He lectured at the University of Copenhagen during 1648–1654 and lived in Paris from 1655 to 1657. He was mathematics tutor to Joscelyne Percy, son of the 10th Earl of Northumberland, at Petworth, Sussex (1657). He taught mathematics in London (1658–1682). On 3 May 1661 he observed a transit of Mercury with Christiaan Huygens and Thomas Streete from Long Acre, London. On 14 November 1666 he was elected a Fellow of the Royal Society. He designed a marine chronometer for Charles II.

In 1682 Jean Colbert invited Mercator to assist in the design and construction of the fountains at the Palace of Versailles, so he relocated there, but a falling-out with Colbert followed.

Mathematically, he is most well known for his treatise Logarithmo-technia on logarithms, published in 1668. In this treatise he described the Mercator series:

$$\ln(1 + x) = x - \frac{1}{2}x^2 + \frac{1}{3}x^3 - \frac{1}{4}x^4 + \cdots \quad \text{for } x \in \ ]-1, 1].$$

Nicholas Mercator was the first person to use the term natural logarithm.

To the field of music, Mercator contributed the first precise account of 53 equal temperament, which was of theoretical importance, but not widely practised.

He died at Versailles in 1687.

== Works ==
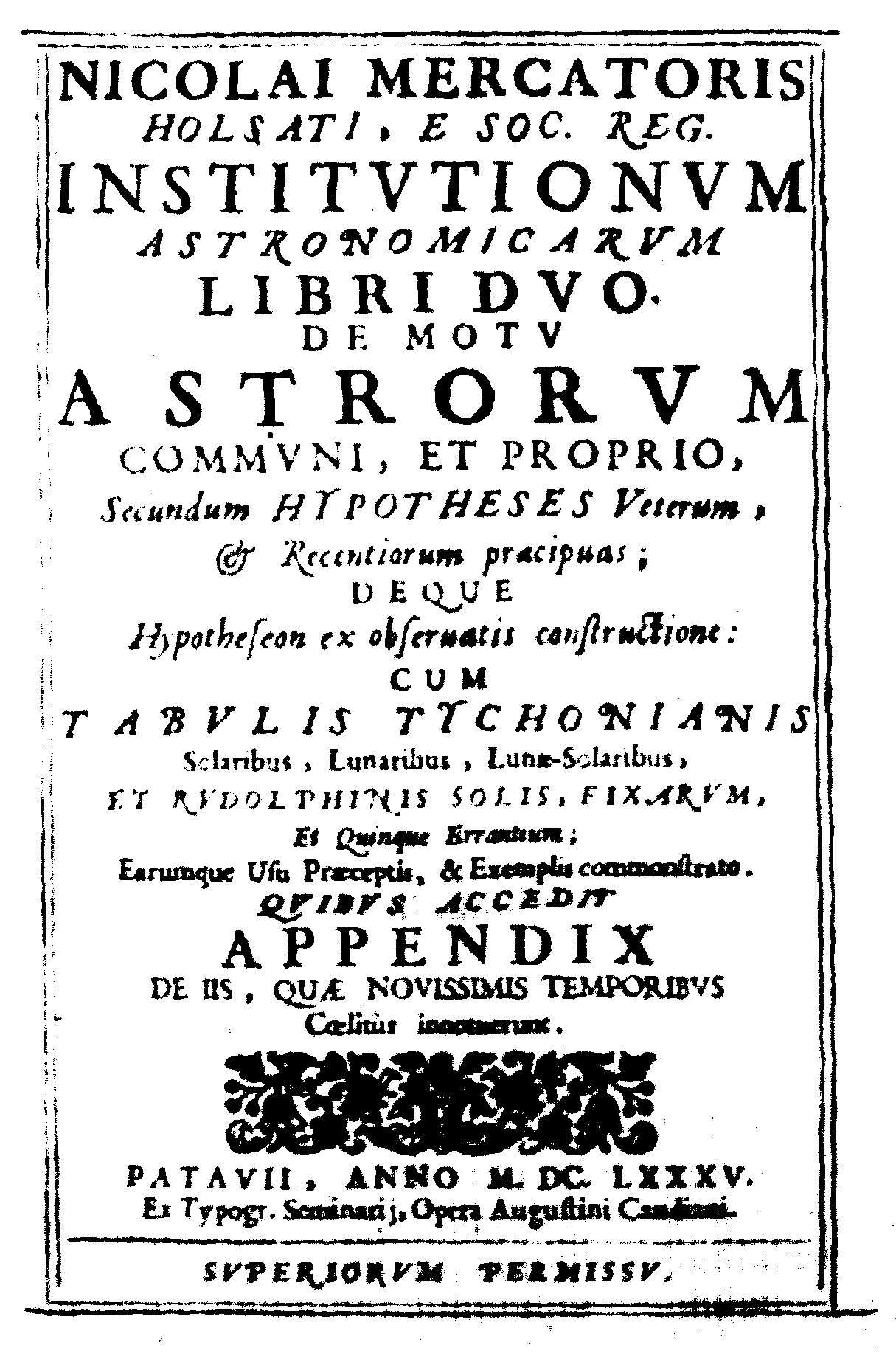
Institutionum astronomicarum libri, 1685

- 1676: Institutionum astronomicarum, London (1685, Padua)
- Institutionum astronomicarum libri duo (in Latin). Pavia: Tipografia del Seminario. 1685.
- Kinkhuysen (1661) Algebra ofte Stelkonst, translated by N. Mercator, appears 1968 in Mathematical Papers of Isaac Newton II: 295–364 with Newton commentary 364–446.
- 1664: Hypothesis astronomica nova, London
- 1666: "Certain problems touching some points of navigation", Philosophical Transactions of the Royal Society 1: 215–18
- 1668: Logarithmo-technia from HathiTrust or Logarithmtechnia from Internet Archive
- Wallis (1668) Review of Logarithmotechnia, Philosophical Transactions of the Royal Society 3: 753–9, followed by "Some further Illustration" by N. Mercator, pp 759–64.
- 1670: "Some considerations … method of Cassini", Philosophical Transactions of the Royal Society 5: 1168–75.
