= Photosonic =

Photosonic is a light-sound concept originally used for the first time by Jacques Dudon for his 'Photosonic Disks'. It was then adopted by VJ/music producer Julyo for his 'Photosonic Guitar'. The term stands for a synesthesia experience, and color sound music.

== See also ==
- Synesthesia
