= 34 equal temperament =

In musical theory, 34 equal temperament, also referred to as 34-tET, 34-EDO or 34-ET, is the tempered tuning derived by dividing the octave into 34 equal-sized steps (equal frequency ratios). Each step represents a frequency ratio of ^{34}√2, or 35.29 cents.

== History and use ==
Unlike divisions of the octave into 19, 31 or 53 steps, which can be considered as being derived from ancient Greek intervals (the greater and lesser diesis and the syntonic comma), division into 34 steps did not arise 'naturally' out of older music theory, although Cyriakus Schneegass proposed a meantone system with 34 divisions based in effect on half a chromatic semitone (the difference between a major third and a minor third, 25:24 or 70.67 cents). Wider interest in the tuning was not seen until modern times, when the computer made possible a systematic search of all possible equal temperaments. While Barbour discusses it, the first recognition of its potential importance appears to be in an article published in 1979 by the Dutch theorist Dirk de Klerk. The luthier Larry Hanson had an electric guitar refretted from 12 to 34 and persuaded American guitarist Neil Haverstick to take it up.

As compared with 31-et, 34-et reduces the combined mistuning from the theoretically ideal just thirds, fifths and sixths from 11.9 to 7.9 cents. Its fifths and sixths are markedly better, and its thirds only slightly further from the theoretical ideal of the 5:4 ratio. Viewed in light of Western diatonic theory, the three extra steps (of 34-et compared to 31-et) in effect widen the intervals between C and D, F and G, and A and B, thus making a distinction between major tones, ratio 9:8 and minor tones, ratio 10:9. This can be regarded either as a resource or as a problem, making modulation in the contemporary Western sense more complex. As the number of divisions of the octave is even, the exact halving of the octave (600 cents) appears, as in 12-et. Unlike 31-et, 34 does not give an approximation to the harmonic seventh, ratio 7:4.

== Interval size ==
Just intonation intervals approximated in 34-ET

The following table outlines some of the intervals of this tuning system and their match to various ratios in the harmonic series.

interval name	size (steps)	size (cents)	midi	just ratio	just (cents)	midi	error
octave	34	1200		2:1	1200		0
ultramajor seventh	33	1164.71		49:25	1165.02		-0.31
diatonic (septimal) major seventh	32	1129.41		27:14	1137.04		-7.63
just major seventh	31	1094.12		15:8	1088.27		+5.85
neutral seventh	30	1058.82		11:6	1049.36		+9.46
classical minor seventh	29	1023.53		9:5	1017.6		+5.93
diatonic minor seventh	28	988.24		16:9	996.09		-7.85
harmonic seventh	27	952.94		7:4	968.83		-15.89
diatonic major sixth	26	917.65		12:7	933.13		-15.48
just major sixth	25	882.35		5:3	884.36		-2.01
diatonic augmented fifth	24	847.06		13:8	840.53		+6.53
just minor sixth	23	811.76		8:5	813.69		-1.93
diatonic minor sixth	22	776.47		11:7	782.49		-6.02
tridecimal inframinor sixth	21	741.18		20:13	745.79		-4.61
perfect fifth	20	705.88		3:2	701.95		+3.93
mavila fifth	19	670.59		28:19	671.31		-0.72
diatonic augmented fourth	18	635.29		13:9	636.62		-1.33
septendecimal tritone	17	600.00		17:12	603.00		−3.00
lesser septimal tritone	17	600.00		7:5	582.51		+17.49
tridecimal narrow tritone	16	564.71		18:13	563.38		+1.32
11:8 wide fourth	16	564.71		11:8	551.32		+13.39
undecimal wide fourth	15	529.41		15:11	536.95		−7.54
perfect fourth	14	494.12		4:3	498.04		−3.93
tridecimal major third	13	458.82		13:10	454.21		+4.61
septimal major third	12	423.53		9:7	435.08		−11.55
undecimal major third	12	423.53		14:11	417.51		+6.02
major third	11	388.24		5:4	386.31		+1.92
tridecimal neutral third	10	352.94		16:13	359.47		−6.53
undecimal neutral third	10	352.94		11:9	347.41		+5.53
minor third	9	317.65		6:5	315.64		+2.01
tridecimal minor third	8	282.35		13:11	289.21		−6.86
septimal minor third	8	282.35		7:6	266.87		+15.48
tridecimal semimajor second	7	247.06		15:13	247.74		−0.68
septimal whole tone	7	247.06		8:7	231.17		+15.88
whole tone, major tone	6	211.76		9:8	203.91		+7.85
whole tone, minor tone	5	176.47		10:9	182.40		−5.93
neutral second, greater undecimal	5	176.47		11:10	165.00		+11.47
neutral second, lesser undecimal	4	141.18		12:11	150.64		−9.46
greater tridecimal 2/3-tone	4	141.18		13:12	138.57		+2.60
lesser tridecimal 2/3-tone	4	141.18		14:13	128.30		+12.88
15:14 semitone	3	105.88		15:14	119.44		−13.56
diatonic semitone	3	105.88		16:15	111.73		−5.85
17th harmonic	3	105.88		17:16	104.96		+0.93
21:20 semitone	2	70.59		21:20	84.47		−13.88
chromatic semitone	2	70.59		25:24	70.67		−0.08
28:27 semitone	2	70.59		28:27	62.96		+7.63
septimal sixth-tone	1	35.29		50:49	34.98		+0.31
