= SeOne =

Nightclub in London, England

seOne
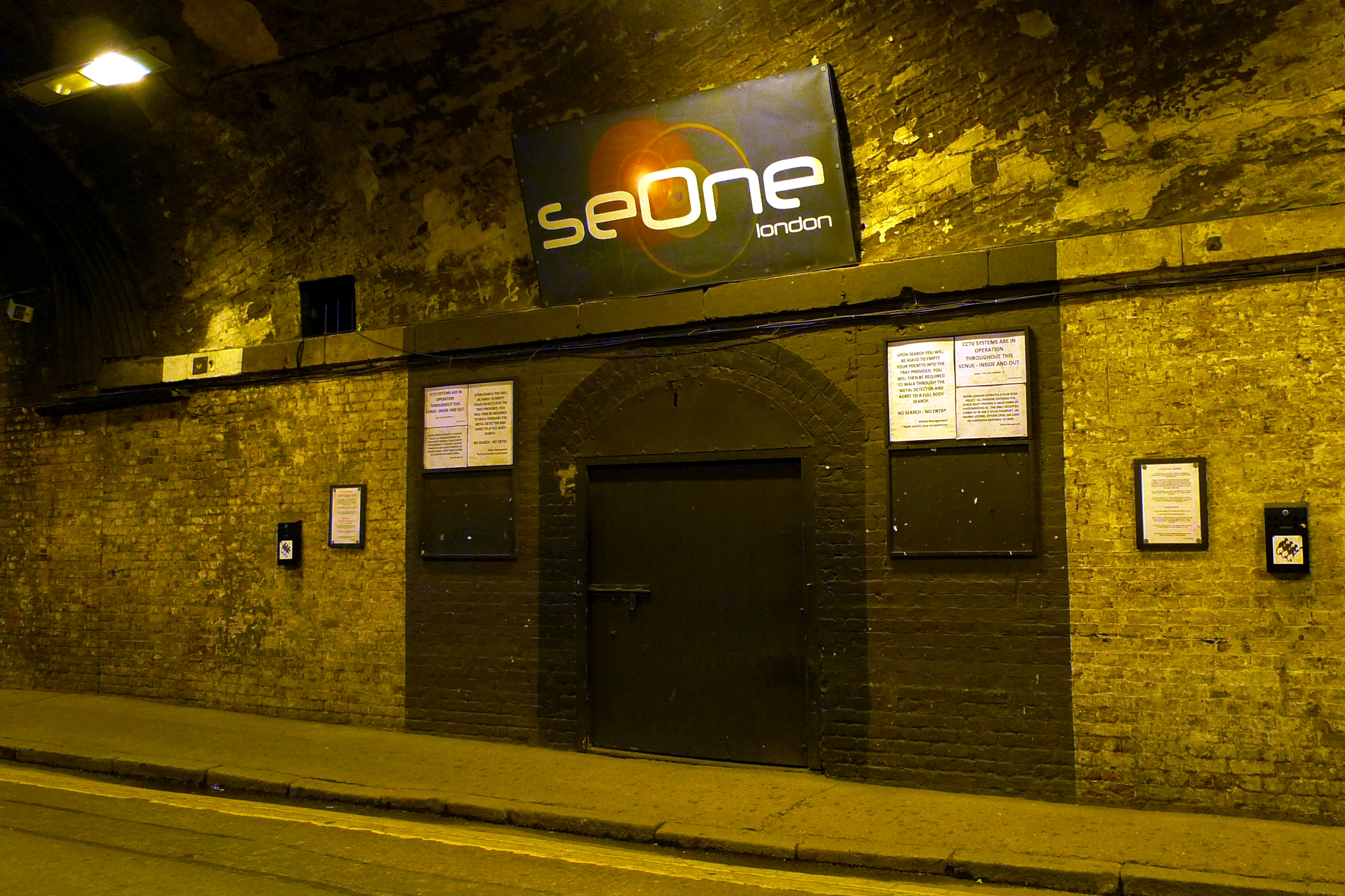
- Interactive map of seOne
- Location: 41–43 Saint Thomas St (entrance in Weston Street tunnel), London, SE1 3QX
- Coordinates: 51°30′14.98″N 0°5′5.01″W
- Capacity: 3,000
- Type: Nightclub

Construction
- Opened: 2002

seOne was a nightclub in London, United Kingdom. It claimed to be London's largest licensed nightclub with a capacity of 3,000 people. It was located on Weston Street underneath the London Bridge transit centre. The licensing authority required the nightclub to scan and retain clubbers' ID details. seOne used Clubscan for this purpose. On 22 February 2010 it officially closed down due to financial difficulties.

On 21 May 2010 it reopened as Debut London, a live music and club venue. Debut London later closed, and the venue was demolished as part of the redevelopment of London Bridge station.
