= Schisma =

Musical interval

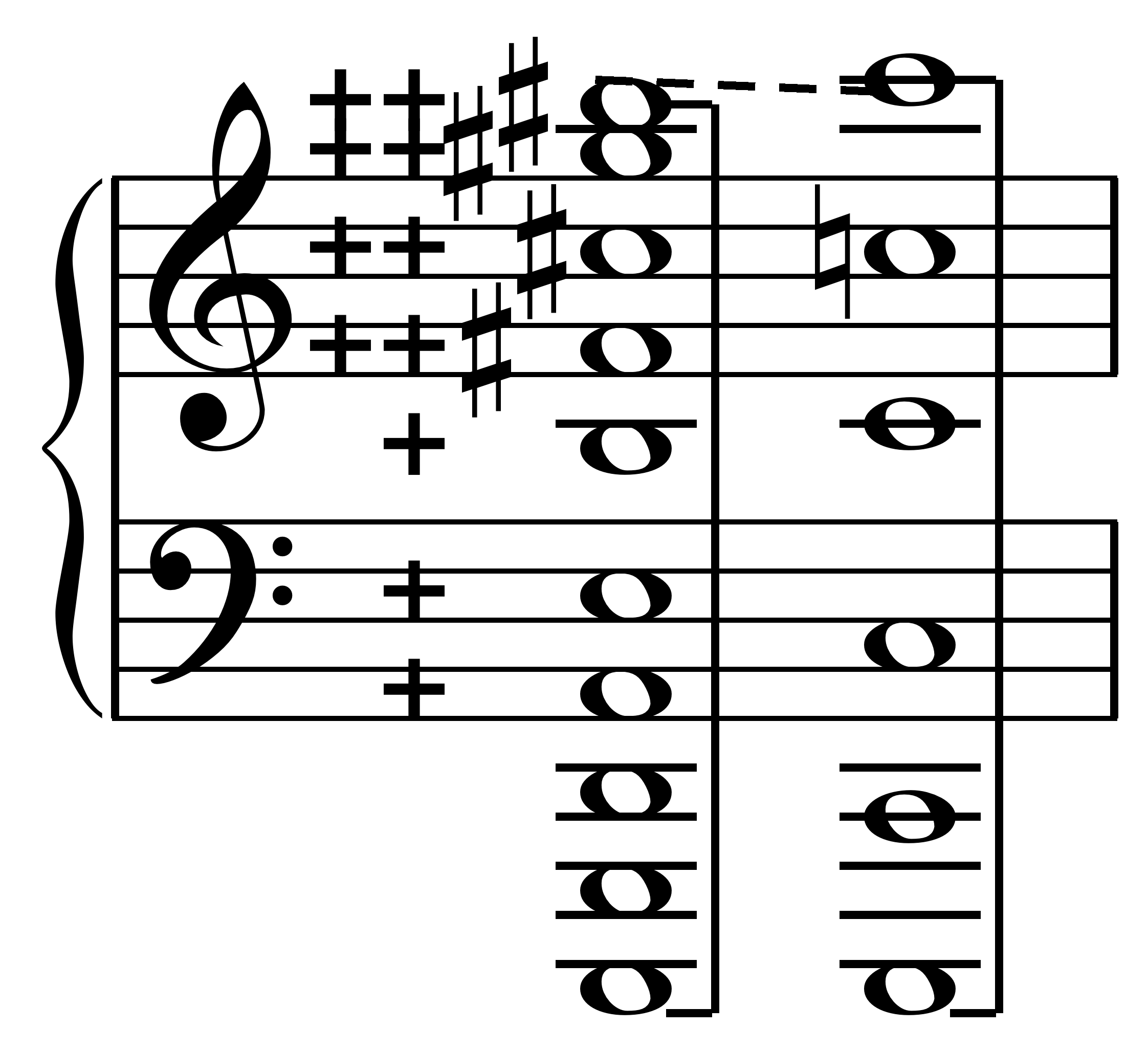
Schisma as difference in cents between 8 perfect fifths plus 1 just major third and 5 octaves.

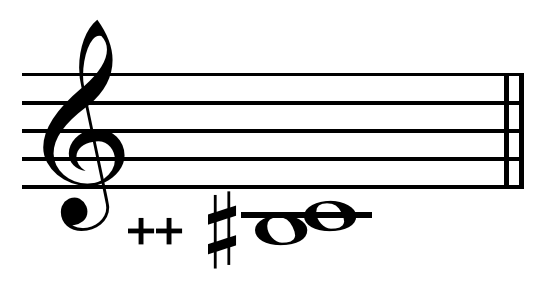
Schisma on C. Note that the note depicted lower on the staff (B#++) is higher in pitch (than C♮).

In music, the schisma (also spelled skhisma) is the interval between the syntonic comma (81:80) and the Pythagorean comma ( 531 441 : 524 288 ), which is slightly larger. It equals ( 5 × 3^{8} )/ 2^{15} or 32 805 : 32 768 ≈ 1.00113, which corresponds to 1.9537 cents. It may also be defined as:

- the difference (in cents) between 8 justly tuned perfect fifths plus a justly tuned major third and 5 octaves;
- the ratio of major limma to the Pythagorean limma;
- the ratio of the syntonic comma and the diaschisma.

Schisma is a Greek word meaning a split or crack (see schism) whose musical sense was introduced by Boethius at the beginning of the 6th century in the 3rd book of his De institutione musica. Boethius was also the first to define the diaschisma.

Andreas Werckmeister defined the grad as the twelfth root of the Pythagorean comma, or equivalently the difference between the justly tuned fifth (3:2) and the equally tempered fifth of 700 cents (2^{7/12}). This value, 1.955 cents, may be well approximated by converting the ratio 886:885 to cents. This interval is also sometimes called a schisma.

$\ 2^{1/12}\ 5^{1/7}\$ is very close to 4:3, the just perfect fourth. This is because the difference between a grad and a schisma is so small. So, a rational intonation version of equal temperament may be obtained by flattening the fifth by a schisma rather than a grad, a fact first noted by Johann Kirnberger, a pupil of Bach. Twelve of these Kirnberger fifths of 16 384 : 10 935 exceed seven octaves, and therefore fail to close, by the tiny interval of $\ \frac{\ 2^{161}\ }{\ 3^{84}\ 5^{12}\ }\ ,$ called the atom of Kirnberger of 0.01536 cents.

Tempering out the schisma leads to a schismatic temperament.

Descartes used the word schisma to mean that which multiplied by a perfect fourth produces 27:20 (519.55 cents); his schisma divided into a perfect fifth produces 40:27 (680.45 cents), and a major sixth times a schisma is 27:16 (905.87 cents). However, by this definition a "schisma" would be what is better known as the syntonic comma (81:80).

== See also ==
- Twelfth root of two
