= Jacques Dudon =

French experimental composer and instrument maker

Jacques Dudon (French pronunciation: [ʒak dydɔ̃]) is a French just intonation composer and instrument builder. He is best known for developing a series of photosonic disk (disque photosonique) instruments in the 1980s that produced sound from modulated light (a light source shines through painted glass discs; the resulting patterns of light are picked up by photo cells and converted into a voltage which can then be treated as a sound signal).

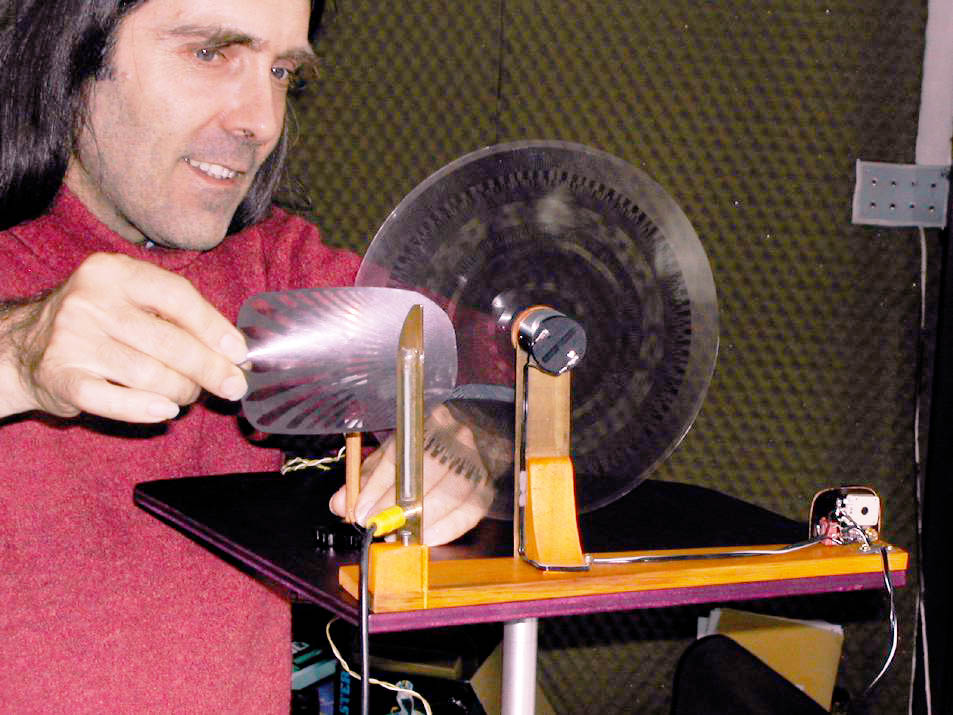
Jacques Dudon playing photosonic disk

The production of synthetic sound in this manner has been used in "optosonic" instruments since the early 20th century (for example the Optophonic Piano). However Dudon's method is notable for the generation of tone which is produced by the overlapping of two or three discs, and the opportunities this design provides for timbral shifts by slowing one or more discs manually, thereby altering the waveform.

In the 1970s, he created 150 water instruments called "aquaphones" (described in his pioneering book La Musique De L'eau), including a "flutabullum", a system of transforming flute sounds by recording them underwater).

== Aquavina ==
The aquavina was an experimental musical instrument created by Jacques Dudon.

It was essentially a variant of the Appalachian dulcimer, but with a metal resonator body partially filled with water. The player would agitate the instrument while playing, resulting in a constant acoustic phasing effect within the instrument's harmonics.
