= David B. Doty =

American classical composer

- Born: 1950 (age 75–76)
- Occupation: Composer
- Years active: 1970 - present

David B. Doty in 2024

David B. Doty (born 1950) is an American composer and authority on just intonation. He is the author of The Just Intonation Primer (1993, 1994, 2002).

Inspired in part by the work of Harry Partch, Doty began composing in 1970 and in 1975 co-founded the San Francisco-based ensemble Other Music with Henry S. Rosenthal and Dale S. Soules. After Doty studied intonation with Lou Harrison, members of Other Music built an American gamelan based on a 14-tone-per-octave just tuning designed by Doty and Soules (see Systêma Ametabolon for comparison). Other Music performed extensively in Northern California using these instruments during the years 1977–1981. Three of Doty's compositions from this period were featured on Other Music's 1980 LP Prime Numbers. Other Music ceased performing publicly in 1981, but in 1983 recorded and released a studio album, Incidents Out of Context, featuring compositions combining gamelan with synthesizers and other acoustic and electro-acoustic instruments.

After the dissolution of Other Music in 1983, Doty began composing for MIDI instruments and sequencers, which he has continued to do into the 21st century. Seven of these compositions in just intonation are included on his 1998 solo CD Uncommon Practice on Syntonic Records.

In 1984, Doty cofounded the Just Intonation Network along with a number of other Northern California just intonation composers and theorists. He served as the editor of the network's journal 1/1 from its inception in 1985 until 2006.

Doty has also been a technical writer and editor and author of computer books, and is an environmental activist. He lives in Santa Fe, New Mexico.

== Discography ==
- Prime Numbers (with Other Music), (1983)
- Incidents of Context (with Other Music), (1983)
- Uncommon Practice, (1998)
- The Steel Suite, (2015)
- The First 50 Years, (2025)

== Selected Compositions ==
- 1973
  - Cantiga Antiqua (consort of early music instruments) (revised for solo harp 2024)
- 1975
  - Cycle of Five #1 (three recorders, guzheng)
  - Recorder Piece #2 for Henry Rosenthal (any number of recorders)
- 1976
  - Cycle of Five, #2 (tubular chimes, five players)
  - Cycle of Five, #3 (five modular metallophones)
  - Hocket (four modular metallophones)
  - Prolation Canon (consort of four equal instruments)
  - 5 x 4 (tubular chimes, four players)
  - Mixed Consort #1 (tubular chimes, flute, violin)
- 1977
  - 24^{2} + 1 (three metallophones and two stamping tubes (later revised for Other Music’s American gamelan))
- 1978
  - Lagu Chondong (Other Music’s American gamelan)
  - Song of the Apostate (Other Music’s American gamelan)
  - Sunagi (Other Music’s American gamelan)
- 1978–79
  - Music With Four Tones (Other Music’s American gamelan)
- 1979
  - Gending: A Waning Moon (Other Music’s American gamelan, with solo flute)
  - Recom III/River of Dreams (Other Music’s American gamelan)
- 1980
  - Dithyramb (Other Music’s American gamelan, with solo English horn, later revised for MIDI instruments)
- 1981
  - Score for Surface Tension† (Other Music’s American gamelan, plus electronic keyboards)
  - Music with Too Many Parts (Other Music’s American gamelan, plus electronic keyboards)
  - Waltz in Pelog (Other Music’s American gamelan with solo cello)
- 1984–95
  - Fake Greek Music (MIDI instruments)‡
  - Fake Irish Music (MIDI instruments)
  - Paradigms Lost (MIDI instruments)
  - Sarabande (MIDI instruments)
  - Waters of the Abyss (MIDI instruments)
  - Son of Fake Greek Music (MIDI instruments)
  - Rituals and Ceremonies (MIDI instruments)
  - Contrapunctus 1.01 (MIDI instruments)
  - Bodhisattvas in Berkeley—Mu! (MIDI instruments)
- 2003–06
  - Lament in Didymus Chromatic (just harpsichord, tack piano, or electronic keyboard) (Later incorporated into The Suite in the "Cinna" Tuning)
  - Steel Suite (National Reso-phonic just intonation guitar) (also exists in a keyboard version)
- 2005–06
  - Variations on a Ground (Movement for String Quartet) (string quartet)
- 2007–2014
  - Parthenion (Women's chorus singing in the Bulgarian diaphonic style, accompanied by virtual instruments)
- 2017
  - Suite in the "Cinna" Tuning (Justly tuned tack piano, harpsichord, or electronic keyboard)
- 2022
  - Eight and Seven is (init?) (Other Music's American gamelan)
- 2023
  - Waters of the Abyss (Virtual instruments)
  - WWDD (What Would Debussy Do)? (Virtual Instruments)

†A performance piece by Laura Farabough and Nightfire Theater

‡MIDI pieces were begun at different times and worked on and revised repeatedly until the creation of the Uncommon Practice CD, so that it is impossible to accurately determine start and finish dates for any of these pieces
