= Wolfgang Zuckermann =

German-born American harpsichord maker (1922–2018)

Wolfgang Joachim Zuckermann
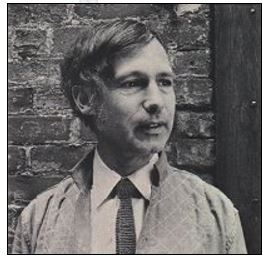
- Zuckermann around 1963
- Born: Wolfgang Joachim Zuckermann; 11 October 1922; Berlin, Germany
- Died: 30 October 2018 (aged 96); Avignon, France
- Occupations: Harpsichord builder, writer
- Known for: DIY harpsichord kits, The Modern Harpsichord
- Notable work: The Modern Harpsichord, The End of the Road, The Mews of London

Wolfgang Joachim Zuckermann (11 October 1922 – 30 October 2018) was a German-born American harpsichord maker and writer. He was known for inventing a highly popular kit for constructing new instruments and wrote an influential book, The Modern Harpsichord. As a social activist, he authored books including The Mews of London and The End of the Road.

== Early life ==
Zuckermann was born in Berlin to Jewish parents in an academic family, and was named Wolfgang after Goethe and Mozart. He had an elder brother, Alexander, who later became a city planner and bicycle advocate in Oakland, California, and a younger brother named Michael. At age eight he began studying the cello, an instrument he continued to play in adulthood. The male family members formed a string quartet, with Alexander playing first violin, the father second, Michael viola, and Wolfgang cello.

With the advent of the Nazis in Germany, Zuckermann's family had to flee the country; they settled in New York in 1938, where Zuckermann's father ran a leather factory. In the same year, Zuckermann became an American citizen and henceforth went by the name "Wallace" (or, in suitable contexts, "Wally"). He saw front line action as a private with the U.S. Army and followed this by obtaining a B.A. in English and psychology (1949) from Queens College, New York, winning the title of Queens College Scholar, the highest honor conferred upon graduates at that institution. He continued for a time studying psychology at the graduate level.

== As harpsichord builder ==
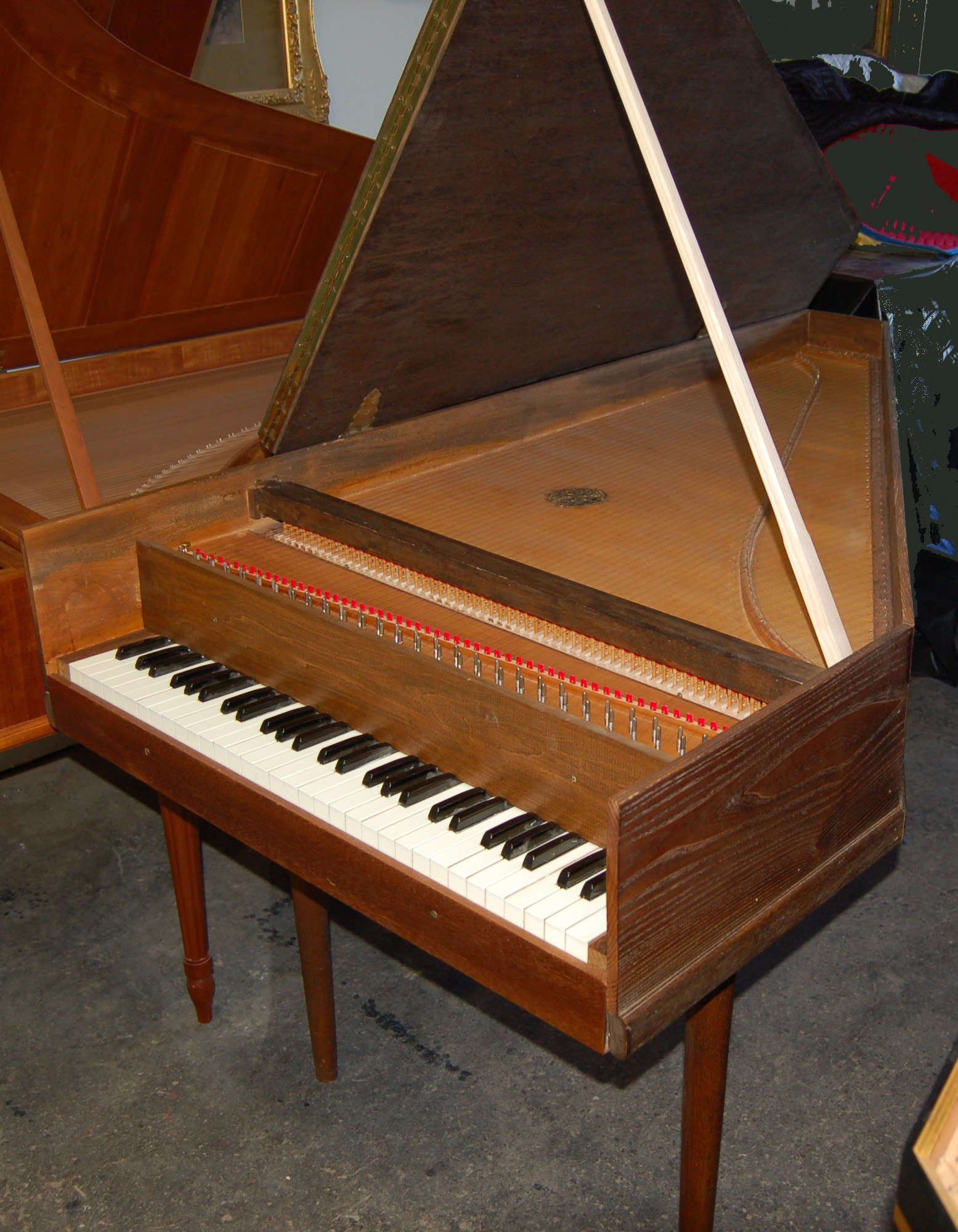
A Zuckermann "Z-box" harpsichord

Zuckermann was employed for a time as "a sort of child psychologist", an occupation he soon gave up. He later noted wryly:

I have always thought mechanical things were easier to manage than living things (like children) because your own skill or ability was the principal element you had to contend with. If "things went wrong" it wasn't in spite of the fact that you always gave your harpsichord your best (which you yourself never had), that you sent it to Sunday School and gave it riding and French lessons, and put it to bed before 11 nightly.

Following this preference, Zuckermann "went to a trade school to learn piano mechanics and tuning and soon set myself up buying, repairing and selling old pianos." His amateur musical activities included Baroque chamber music, and the combination of his vocation and avocation soon led to an interest in harpsichords. He built his first instrument in 1955.

As a builder, Zuckermann was self-taught. He describes how he sought information: "Dropping in on Frank Hubbard in Boston (one of three American harpsichord makers) as a complete stranger, I was given a guided tour of his workshop on a Sunday morning after getting him out of bed. (I must say, he is as close to a saint as I've ever met.) The Metropolitan Museum opened its basement for me, and other collections were kind and cooperative." With this informal background Zuckermann succeeded in building his first harpsichord, which was rather similar in form to the kit instrument he started selling a number of years later.

The time was propitious for a new maker. Musical tastes were evolving, with a revived interest in Baroque music and historically informed performance. The newly-perfected long playing record made possible the widespread distribution of high-quality recordings of Baroque works. Moreover, there were very few makers producing harpsichords in America. Thus Zuckermann found that there was high demand for his instruments and he soon had established a new business as a harpsichord builder. By 1960, he had sold "seventy or eighty instruments".

By this point, Zuckermann had become frustrated by the amount of time he spent on service calls, and became concerned that maintenance would soon consume all of his available time. He conceived the idea that if his customers were to build their instruments themselves from a kit, they would then be self-sufficient with regard to maintenance. He first tested the idea on friends:

I gave a few of my friends all the raw parts necessary to make a harpsichord and some rudimentary directions. These were people who wanted an instrument but couldn't afford one, and they seized on this chance. Even the less mechanical ones were thrilled with the prospect and their sheer will to possess such an instrument made them better craftsmen than experienced cabinet makers.

Implemented commercially in 1960, the kit idea proved an extraordinary success; the "do-it-yourself" harpsichord kit, sometimes called the 'Model T' harpsichord, was sold in large quantities (over 10,000 by 1969) to institutions, professionals, and individuals around the world. Harpsichord scholar Edward Kottick writes, "Wolfgang Zuckermann never intended to become a phenomenon; he only hoped to satisfy a demand for harpsichords he himself could not accommodate. Nevertheless, his harpsichord kit spawned a unique movement whose heyday lasted for twenty years and helped fuel the instrument's revival. Some of today's finest builders got their start with a Zuckermann slantside kit."

Initially the wooden pieces for the case, along with some other commonly available parts, were not included, so the price was set at a most economical $150. Little by little, the Zuckermann kit became more elaborate and complete. By the mid 1960s unassembled cases consisting of carefully cut unfinished wood of various kinds could be purchased optionally. Other instrument kits were also made available, including a spinet harpsichord (1966) and a clavichord.

=== Production ===
The headquarters for kit production was Zuckermann's New York workshop on Christopher Street in Greenwich Village; for a time this continued to produce completed instruments, though eventually the burden of making enough kits to fill demand led Zuckermann to abandon this part of the business. The evolved production system included some work in the shop itself, but with substantial outsourcing to larger enterprises.

Operations at the shop are described in a memoir by the poet Eleanor Lerman, who was hired in 1970 at age 18 to work on the production line. The description slightly postdates Zuckermann's departure from the company; "Michael" is Michael Zuckermann, Wolfgang's younger brother.

At the time, Zuckermann Harpsichords ... was housed in the first floor of a small, quirky 19th century building on Charles Street. Michael not only gave me a job, he gave me a tiny apartment upstairs. The whole operation employed about five girls, who drilled pin blocks, used a table saw and a lathe, but also worked on eccentric machines that Michael had made himself out of sewing machine parts: we used those to wind wire, cut felt and velvet, and make the jacks that pluck harpsichord strings. Sometimes we ran out of parts and I was supposed to write what we needed on a blackboard. Instead ... I used the blackboard to write poems.

Zuckermann himself observed (in his book The Modern Harpsichord) that the workforce in harpsichord shops of the time tended to consist of nontraditional workers.

Among the outsourced items, the most important was the parts for the case, which had to be precision-cut, mitered, and (for the outer case), veneered. Zuckermann enlisted capable help from nearby:

Through a friend I was introduced to a giant woodworking plant [in Philadelphia], covering several city blocks, with automatic-feed circular saws, gang drills (14 drill presses coming down automatically at the same time) and gang combinations of automatic saws and drills which can cut a piece to size, miter it and drill it on several sides, all in one operation. ... The key to the quality of production work is the presence of one or two really experienced and careful shop foremen, whose task it is to set up the machines. ... In Philadelphia the shop foremen are old, European craftsmen. When they are gone, the question of succession will loom large.

The factory also handled the tasks of wrapping, packaging, and shipping. It turned out sets of case parts in lots of 500.

Keyboards, which are hard for amateurs to make, were bought from other companies. Zuckermann made it possible for kit builders to provide dark naturals and white sharps by selling (as an option) blank keyboards, to which the builder would glue appropriate coverings.

The plywood for the soundboard, a key element of the instrument, was special-ordered; the boards were made of "3-ply basswood, 1/8 in. thick, which is not commercially available but had to be made up specially in a New England plant. A minimum of 300 sheets (each making two boards) had to be ordered at one time."

=== The customer base ===
Zuckermann's kit harpsichord became one of the most popular harpsichord models ever; it was assembled by people of all ages and given affectionate nicknames such the "Slantside" or the "Z-box".

America in the 1960s was perhaps ripe for the success of a harpsichord kit. Americans of the day had essentially no computers or other digital equipment with which to spend their free time, and recreational activity involving the assembly of things was widespread. Thus in 1966 a newspaper reporter introduced the idea of a harpsichord kit to his readers thus: "A nation raised on homemade kites and model airplane kits is discovering that it hasn't conquered the last frontier with do-it-yourself hi-fi components. Today, thanks to a slight, graying tinkerer in New York's Greenwich Village, you can be the first on your block to build your own harpsichord."

Zuckermann kept track of his more unusual customers, writing later in The Modern Harpsichord:

Once a 300-pound truck driver walked into the shop, sat down, rattled off a Bach invention, and pulled out the cash to buy a kit, all in dollar bills. A 13-year-old boy appeared with the contents of a piggy bank ... A prison warden once wrote us that a convict had made a harpsichord while serving time for murder.

More systematically, he found that his buyers were typically rather educated; advertising was more effective in magazines that targeted this audience, such as Saturday Review or The New Yorker. Inhabitants of small college towns, and academics in particular, were overrepresented among purchasers.

Kottick reports that some builders were unable to stop at one; they "built kit after kit, often selling them cheaply or even giving them away."

The Zuckermann kits were poignantly present during the wars then taking place in Southeast Asia. The reporter quoted above went on to say, "Zuckermann reports a large clientele in foreign countries, the armed forces, and the Peace Corps, where instruments may be scarce or a complicated project is effective antidote to loneliness, boredom, or combat fatigue. One Navy officer has his clavichord with him on an aircraft carrier. Zuckermann reports he recently sent kits to three soldiers in Viet Nam and three complete harpsichords now grace the U.S. Embassy in Phnom Penh, Cambodia, where one customer wrote of tuning [an instrument] to the accompaniment of gunfire."

=== The Z-box as instrument ===
The Zuckermann kit harpsichord was designed to maximize affordability, and therefore involved considerable outsourcing of parts to manufacturers who could create them with the cost advantage derived from mass production. The harpsichord was also designed to be assembled by amateurs, which was one factor in using (initially) a straight piece where most harpsichords employ a curved bentside. Kottick describes and assesses the Z-box thus:

The outer case of 1/2" cabinet wood was glued to an inner case of 3/4" plywood, making a heavily framed case capable of taking a great deal of punishment, to say the least. ... [The instrument was a ] single-strung slant-side (rather than bentside) with an AA-f^{3} compass, a buff stop, a half hitch, and plastic jacks quilled with leather. The 5'-long case was too short for the bass strings, and the bottom three or four notes lacked authority. Nevertheless, the soundboard barring was based on classical principles and helped to contribute to a useful sound at a surprising volume. The instrument had the additional virtue of simplicity: rather than a complex machine designed to produce an instantaneous variety of colors, it was a basic keyboard that plucked the strings. Hence, despite its considerable flaws, a well-built kit harpsichord could give more musical result than many of the thousands of revival instruments then in service.

By "revival instrument", Kottick refers to the elaborate, multichoired, ahistorical instruments that at the time were being turned out by the thousands by factories primarily in Germany.

There were a number of ways in which the original Zuckermann instrument was very much historically "inauthentic". Kottick mentions the "straightside", the extremely thick case walls, the use of plywood in the inner case, and the use of plastic for jacks. In addition, the soundboard was plywood as well; the keyboard was of heavy piano-type construction; the jacks rested on adjustable endpins rather than directly on the keys; the plectra could be moved toward or away from the string by an adjustment screw; and the strings were made of modern instrument wire rather than the softer wire of historical times. It was also unusual for a historical harpsichord the size of a Z-box to have just one choir of strings. All of these constructional factors came to be increasingly avoided by builders (including the firm Zuckermann founded) as the field of harpsichord making moved toward a historicist approach; see Kottick (2003:ch. 19) and History of the harpsichord.

=== The Modern Harpsichord ===
Around 1967, Zuckermann began a period of travel, visiting harpsichord workshops in both the United States and Europe. He described his research findings in his 1969 book The Modern Harpsichord, a wide-ranging survey of the harpsichord makers of the time, covering their philosophies and instrument designs. Zuckermann also relied on his experience as a harpsichord technician who had worked on a wide variety of instruments.

The main theme of the book was a forceful advocacy of historical principles in harpsichord construction; that is, in favor of work that attempted to recreate instruments of the kind built by the great makers of the past using lightweight construction and preindustrial materials. Zuckermann judged that the long experience of the builders of the 16th through 18th centuries had already discovered the most reliable ways to create robust and beautiful tone; and that the innovations of most 20th century builders, based mainly on the technology of the piano, had yielded feeble-toned instruments that were difficult to maintain in good playing condition.

Zuckermann's preference for historical principles was especially evident in the book's warmly appreciative account of the work of three builders, Frank Hubbard, William Dowd, and Martin Skowroneck, who are acknowledged today as the key figures in the move toward historically-based harpsichord construction. It is also seen in Zuckermann's outright mockery of the major firms of the time who were building the heavily designed ahistorical instruments. For instance, of the Sabathil firm, he wrote (pp. 172–4):

Sabathil [has] brought [the] tradition of the German production harpsichord to its highest pinnacle of non-achievement. [Of their instruments ], the greatest of them all is the Bach III, a full 10' long, which I had the privilege of seeing not long ago. This enormous creature, crouching against an entire living room wall, has perhaps something endearing about it. ... It has been compared to a stegosaurus, the giant extinct animal with plated back. However, whatever charm it may have had was not sufficient to prevent its owner from ordering a new harpsichord from a Boston maker with the intention of selling his present one. ... The tone issuing from the giant Bach III comes out predictably not with a bang but a whimper.

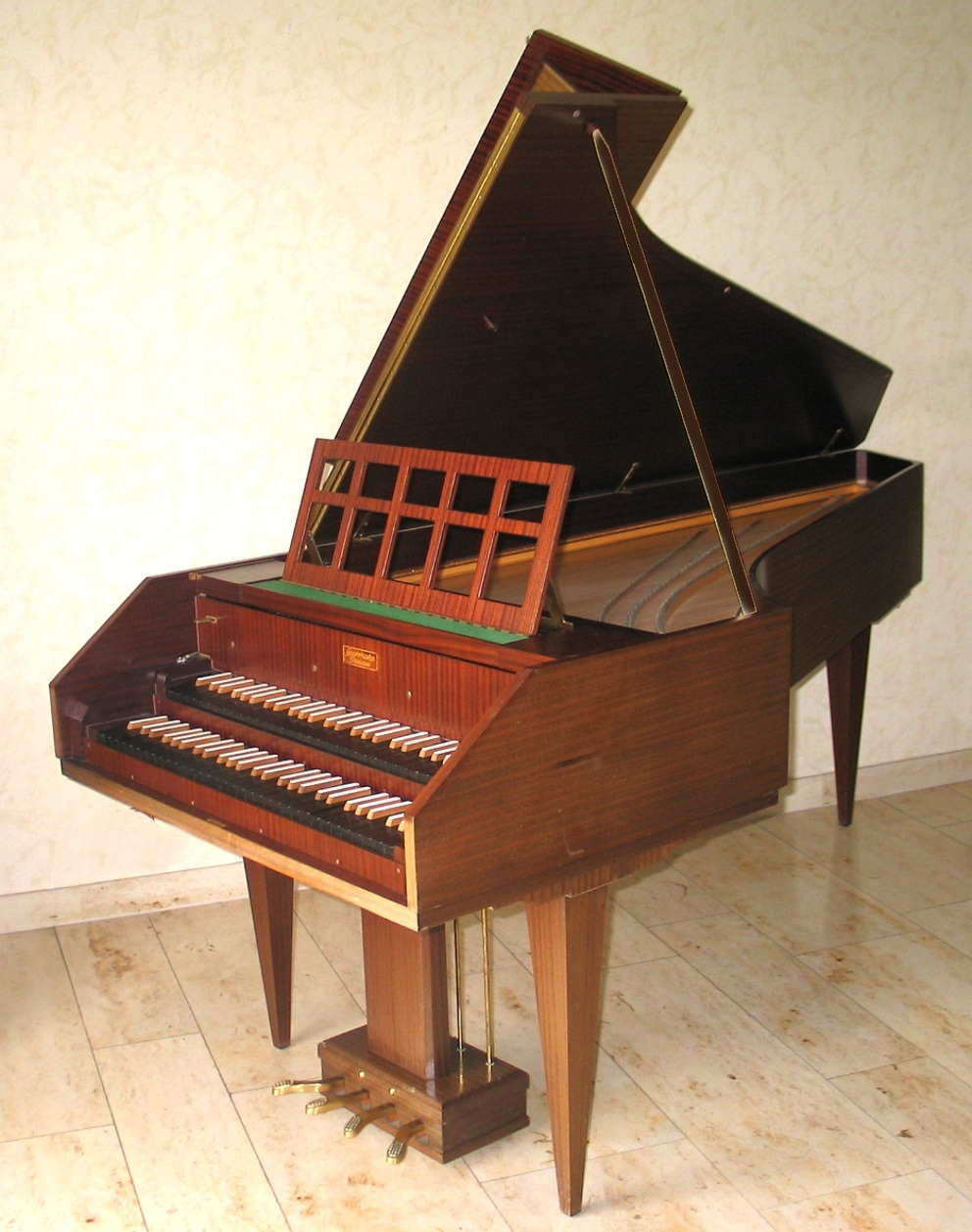
A heavy-framed mid-century harpsichord by the Sperrhake firm, sharply criticized in Zuckermann's book

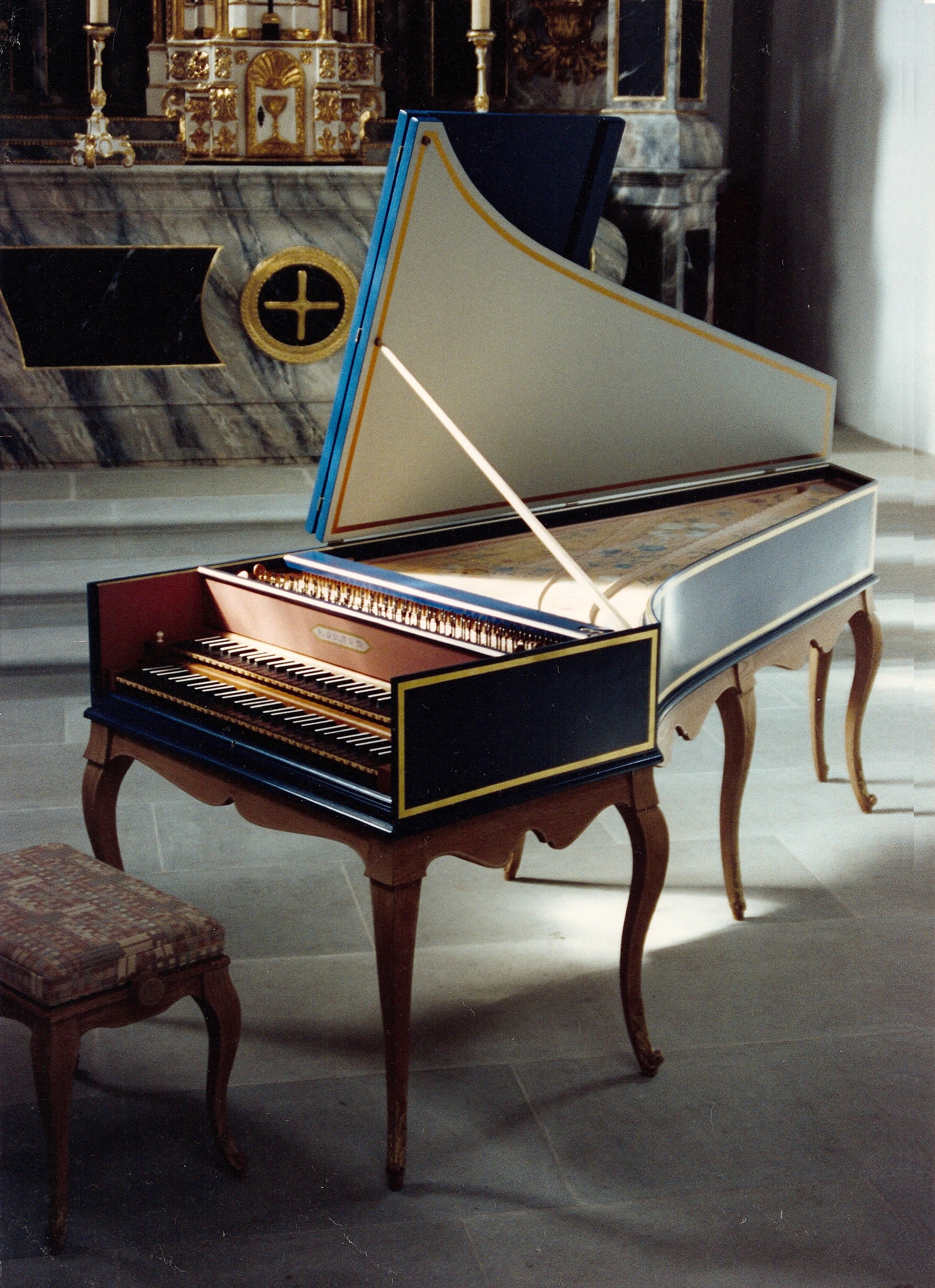
A characteristic example of a modern harpsichord built on historical principles, built by Jean-Paul Rouaud based on a 1707 harpsichord by Nicolas Dumont.

He characterized an instrument from the Neupert firm thus: it "suffers from laryngitis, possessing a coarse, whispering tone."

Zuckermann also attacked the German production harpsichord on grounds of its visual esthetics, characterizing it as tubby and ugly; he further asserted that the historical builders virtually always created instruments of grace and beauty.

Kottick (1987) described the effect of The Modern Harpsichord: "[it] landed on the harpsichord world like bombshell, clearly showing, on page after page, the superiority of those instruments constructed on classical principles over the revival [i.e., then-mainstream] harpsichords, with all their "improvements". According to harpsichord builder Carey Beebe, the book actually "altered the course of modern harpsichord development." The conflict between the two approaches of building was indeed a live one at the time Zuckermann wrote his book, but is no longer; authentically-oriented harpsichords completely dominate the field today.

The book undoubtedly upset the attacked parties very much; Zuckermann's friend David Jacques Way reported that several German makers threatened lawsuits, and the book was eventually banned in Germany.

The book suggests that its author valued rationality in harpsichord building and was seldom swayed by the more romantic aspects of the craft. For instance, Zuckermann suggested that machine tools properly used will always cut and drill more accurately than can be done by hand, and argued that any sort of beneficial "sensitivity" to the material claimed by the craftsman using hand tools will carry over to the craftsman using machine tools if she gets sufficient practice. He offers a diffident defense of plywood in harpsichords, suggesting it should not be dismissed out of hand and that careful comparisons of cases where plywood and solid parts have been interchanged in the same instrument are worth doing and (as of 1969) inconclusive.

Through accident of alphabetical order, the last harpsichord builder discussed in Zuckermann's book is his own company. He mentions the essential ways in which his kit harpsichords were historically "authentic" (i.e. in having thin soundboards with light barring that avoids overlap with the bridge) and he confronts with candor the ways in which his instruments were most certainly not "authentic" (for these, see discussion above). Zuckermann also defends some aspects of inauthenticity as the necessary consequence of their being designed to be affordable and constructible by amateurs.

=== Exit from the harpsichord business ===
The experience of researching authenticist instruments for The Modern Harpsichord evidently had a drastic effect on Zuckermann's own career as a builder. Kottick writes, "As a result of his experience in writing the book and the introspection it engendered, Zuckermann decided to stop producing his less-than-ideal instrument and sold his kit business [1970] to David Way." Way had been the publisher of The Modern Harpsichord and become an enthusiast for harpsichord building in the process. Way shifted the firm's productions in the direction of more historically authentic instruments, making use of Zuckermann's research. The company continued to flourish and is still in business today.

Although his subsequent career moved in different directions, Zuckermann remained part of the harpsichord world for some time. Living in England (see below) he designed instrument kits on historical lines in collaboration with builder Michael Thomas: a harpsichord in Italian style and a clavichord. He also wrote for several years a quarterly column for the periodical Harpsichord, and served a consultant to other makers. According to Schott (1986) Zuckermann's involvement ended completely by the late 1970s.

=== Sponsorship of performing arts during the harpsichord years ===
During his time as a manufacturer of harpsichord kits, Zuckermann became involved in the performing arts. In July 1963, in collaboration with Eric Britton, he founded the Sundance Festival of the Chamber Arts in rural Pennsylvania; it featured classical concerts, marionette operas, theater, dance, and poetry. During the later years, the festival was co-run by Zuckermann and his friend Michael Smith, who was theater critic for the Village Voice; they had met when Townsend interviewed him for his newspaper. Smith described the venue thus:

Deep in the woods in northern Bucks County, Pennsylvania, two hours west of New York, they had built a small covered stage and a wide amphitheatre for the audience that was open to the stars. It was extremely charming, and we presented a wondrous range of artists over the next three summers. Farther up the drive beyond the theatre, there were two houses, a barn, a tennis court, a big concrete swimming [pool] down in the woods, and a screened-in summer house. ... The performers often came for the weekend and enjoyed the facilities.

The amphitheater was designed by Zuckermann himself, seated 425, and included "a canvas roof for rainy weather." Not surprisingly, the performers included eminent harpsichordists: Paul Jacobs, Ralph Kirkpatrick, and Fernando Valenti.

Later, Zuckermann and Smith launched a further arts collaboration as sponsors of Caffe Cino, a coffee house cum off-off-Broadway theater located near his harpsichord workshop on Christopher Street. The theater's repertoire included edgy productions presenting aspects of gay life (both theater and workshop were very near the Stonewall Inn, site of the Stonewall riots of 1969, a historical landmark in history of the gay rights movement).

The theater had fallen on hard times following the 1967 suicide of its founder, Joseph Cino. Smith and Zuckermann bought the theater, but quickly found it was not easy to rescue it. Cino had, it appears, been paying off the police in order to run an establishment not permitted by the zoning laws, and Smith and Zuckermann were unwilling to try to follow in his footsteps. According to Schanke and Marra, "authorities swooped down on the still-illegal operation. 1,250 violations quickly accumulated on the place."

The nadir of the experience for Zuckermann was a night spent in jail, as Stone relates:

[The play] Empire State features [among other characters] ... an obnoxious boy of ten. It also features an obscenity that caused problems for the coffeehouse. Zuckermann ... wrote ... about the event, "two inspectors dressed as hippies came and watched one of our plays [Empire State] containing what was then considered a dirty word, starting with 'mother'". Because the obscenity was said in front of a child performing in the play, Zuckermann and one of the actors who was also the boy's uncle were arrested on January 26, 1968, only three days after the Caffe's opening. According to the arrest record, the criminal act was to "permit child to act in theratical [sic] production, acts and diolgue [sic] impair morals charge." When officials returned the child to his home, his mother's first words were, "how come you're back so early?"

As Smith relates, the charge was dismissed in the morning. But Stone goes on to say:

In addition to ending the run of the production, the incident was deeply upsetting to Zuckermann, who as a child had fled the Nazis with his parents. Feeling oppressed in the United States, which seemed headed toward fascism, Zuckermann lost his enthusiasm for operating the Cino. ... Within a year [he] had sold his business and moved from the United States.

Caffe Cino itself did not last much longer than Empire State: it closed permanently on 10 March 1968.

== As activist ==
The 1960s, when Zuckermann's harpsichord project flourished, was also the time of when the American government sent its troops to fight in a controversial war in Vietnam, leading to a sharp rise in domestic political activism. Zuckermann was an impassioned opponent of the war, who in a 1967 letter to the Village Voice described American policy as "mass murder". Elsewhere he described the process of his political radicalization: "Like many others I was "radicalized" by three events: sitting on the steps of the Pentagon, watching the Democratic Convention on tv, and being jailed." He was a sponsor of Angry Arts week (25 January - 5 February 1967), an effort by the artistic community to rally opposition to the war.

By 1969, Zuckermann's despair over the war had reached the point where he decided to leave the country. He left New York for England, where he bought and moved into Stafford Barton, a 15th century house in rural Devonshire with 28 acres of fields and gardens. There, he "r[a]n a crafts business, ... work[ing] with kids who would otherwise be dropouts"; he also "play[ed] chamber music and tennis with the local gentry." He reported his experience, and his thoughts about England, in a 1971 contribution to The Village Voice.

With time, Zuckermann shifted his emphasis from harpsichords to his second career as a political activist. He played an active part in creating small local collaborative projects that cut away from the values and patterns of the dominant consumer society. While living in London, he noted the five hundred mews (former stable blocks) in that city as, contrary to professional planning views at the time, a viable city environment, and proceeded to write with co-author Barbara Rosen The Mews of London: A Guide to the Hidden Byways of London's Past (1982).

In 1987 Zuckermann began his collaboration with The Commons, an independent non-profit policy research group based in Paris. Through 1994 he was a Senior Associate, writer and editor of a program called the New Mobility Agenda which looks at ways in which we could arrange our transportation (and our lives) so that people could obtain better access to the places they live and work. The project eventually led to a search for ideas, suggestions, and possible solutions from people and places around the world. Zuckermann's significant experience as a 'kit builder' on a large international scale was one of the important driving forces behind the program and its various spin-offs and demonstration projects.

End of the Road (1991) was written as an attempt to pull together all the rich body of information and ideas being generated by the New Mobility project, in an easily readable form, addressed to the general public, and put into jargon-free and vivid language not generally found in the transportation literature. Zuckermann followed this up with a number of other EcoPlan projects such as co-author of a children's book, Family Mouse Behind the Wheel (1992), as well as taking a leading role in The Commons Car Free Days program. His book Alice in Underland (2000) looks at today's technology and society matters (and manners) from a perspective somewhat different from that usually encountered in the literature.

In 1994 Zuckermann collaborated with Eric Britton, with whom he had worked much earlier on the Sundance Festival, to create an interactive program under The Commons for something they called "Consumer Holiday – The one day a year we turn off the economy and think about it". Shortly however they became aware of a well financed Canadian program with many of the same objectives, Buy Nothing Day, and decided to convert their collaborative project into an international support site that looked at a broader range of problems, ideas, paths and solutions, which would help to amplify and compete the Canadian project. Thus the International Buy Nothing Day program was born and continues to this day.

Zuckermann moved to France around 1995. Following the move he continued his research, writing, and editing activities with The Commons.

=== As bookstore owner ===
Wolfgang Zuckermann photographed in his Avignon bookshop in 2005

In June 1994 he became founder and owner-manager of Shakespeare, an English-language bookstore and arts center in Avignon, named after a famous earlier "Shakespeare" bookstore run in Paris in the early 20th century by Sylvia Beach (Beach was the first publisher of James Joyce's oft-censored novel Ulysses.)

Zuckermann and Britton described the store as "a bookstore and arts center ... which resolutely refuses the separation of 'culture' from the issues of technology, society and personal responsibility." A 2008 visitor described the store thus, "A small but well stocked hideaway just inside the medieval city walls near Porte St Lazare, the shop is infused with the character of its owner. Customers whisper and books are taken from the shelves with reverence, as the dignified, silver-haired Wolfgang Zuckermann presides in benign tranquillity. Even in the café (where Mr Zuckermann will rustle you up a surprising - and surprisingly good - English cream tea with home-made scones) the only sounds are quiet chewing, tinkling china, pages turning and murmurs of literary conversation."

Zuckermann retired from running the bookstore in 2012; it still exists under other ownership. He died in late 2018 in Avignon, France.

== Miscellany ==
- Zuckermann reported his favorite composer to be Joseph Haydn, noting that rather few of this composer's most celebrated works were written for harpsichord.
- To illustrate the point that harpsichord builders are not always personally efficient he mentioned (in The Modern Harpsichord, p. 68) that he spent a fair amount of the time in his Greenwich Village workshop building medieval furniture.
- In response to an article in the New York Times (1996) describing the "McTheory" that no two countries with McDonald's restaurants had ever gone to war with one another, he penned a letter to the editor saying, " I used to consider myself a pacifist, but after reading Mr. Friedman's McTheory ... I can't help wishing that such countries would declare war against each other — and target their missiles exclusively on each other's McDonald's. That way there would be one less, instead of one more, McDonald's every three hours."

== See also ==
- List of historical harpsichord makers
