= Sundance Festival of the Chamber Arts =

Festival in Upper Black Eddy, Pennsylvania

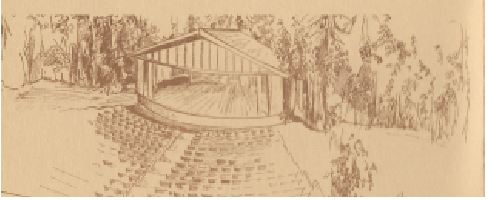
The open-air theater at Sundance

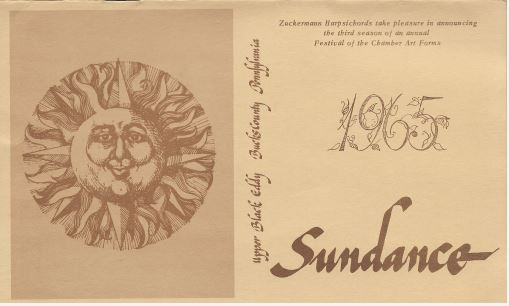
Program cover from 1965

The Sundance Festival of the Chamber Arts was a cultural summer festival that took place for several years during the 1960s in Upper Black Eddy in Bucks County, Pennsylvania. It was the brainchild of the noted harpsichord builder/entrepreneur Wolfgang Zuckermann.

== History ==
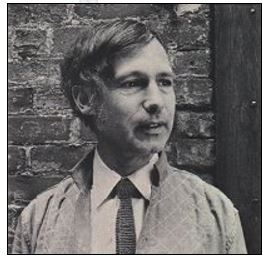
Wolfgang Zuckermann, ca. 1963

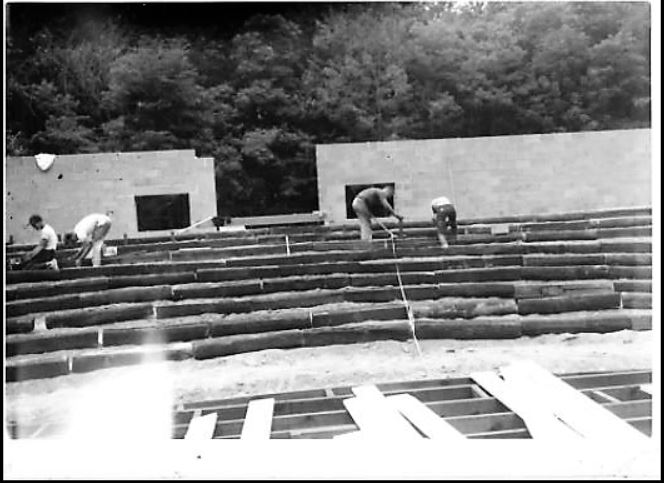
The amphitheater under construction

Zuckermann's successful career as a seller of build-it-yourself harpsichord kits had been facilitated by a surge of public interest in music of the Baroque and classical periods. The festival was founded in 1963 by Zuckermann together with his colleague Eric Britton in response to this surge, as well as to rising interest in chamber music and related art forms.

The two built a charming open-air amphitheater, seating 250 people. The amphitheater was originally designed by Zuckermann himself and redesigned and built in partnership with local contractors. It was located on a 55-acre estate in the rural town of Upper Black Eddy, Northern Bucks County, Pennsylvania, a bit more than one hour from New York City (where Zuckermann ran his business in Greenwich Village) and rather less from Philadelphia. The rural surroundings added to the appeal of the enterprise, as Michael Townsend Smith (who succeeded Britton as director in 1966) later wrote:

It was extremely charming, and we presented a wondrous range of artists over the next three summers. Farther up the drive beyond the theatre, there were two houses, a barn, a tennis court, a big concrete swimming down in the woods, and a screened-in summer house. ... The performers often came for the weekend and enjoyed the facilities.

Zuckermann served as Managing Director, Eric Britton as Associate Director (1963-1965, followed by Smith). The festival featured chamber music, other musical artists (including, not surprisingly, various eminent harpsichordists), and some off-the-beaten path offering such as marionette opera.

The festival took place in the months of July and August. There were two performances weekly, Friday and Saturday nights, solely dedicated to chamber music, modern dance, drama, poetry readings, and film. Admission was $2.00 per concert.

The chamber music events were entirely devoted to classical music and featured some of the most appreciated groups of the time (Galimir String Quartet, the Kroll Quartet, the Claremont Quartet, Krainis Baroque Trio), harpsichordists (including Fernando Valenti, Sylvia Marlowe, Pamela Cook, Robert Conant), and distinguished musicians and singers (Helen Boatwright, Sanford Allen, Peter Serkin, Michael Tree, Rey de la Torre, Daniel Weisman, Suzanne Bloch among them).

An edge to the festival was given by less familiar, at times more experiment works, such as the dance presentations of the James Waring Company, Merce Cunningham (and John Cage), and Yvonne Rainer, among them. Sundance also presented off-off Broadway plays, marionette operas, poetry readings Allen Ginsburg and low budget films of what was then called the Independent American Cinema.

The last performances at Sundance took place in Summer 1968. In 1969, Zuckermann moved to England, selling both his harpsichord business as well as the Sundance property, and the Sundance Festival came to an end.

== Reception ==
One enthusiastic patron wrote at the time: "Sundance is the newest and brightest star in the Bucks County firmament. The setting is a charming sylvan one, deep in a wooded area. The comfortable seating is, in true theater fashion so that one has an obstructed view from every point. The stage is handsome having a proscenium on which the names of the geniuses of the past and present are carved in gold on a dark brown with background. But the most interesting aspect before one enters the open air seating area and views the stage is that of the Mexican Indian like stucco wall, which forms the background of the theater, and seems to convey the idea of an abstract painting. And there is peace and beauty here – and excitement."

== Programming ==
=== 1963 ===
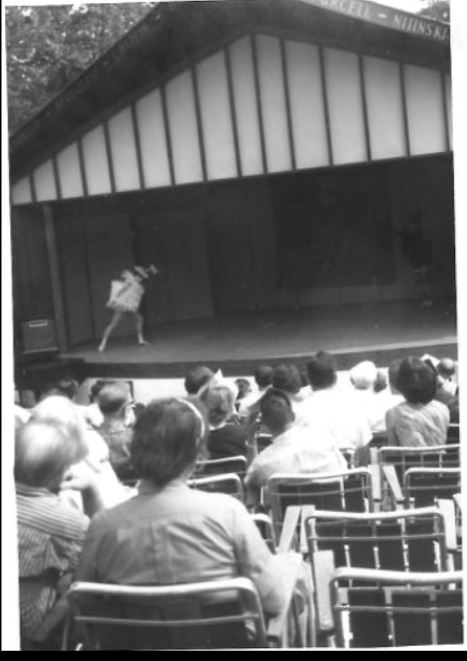
A dance rehearsal from 1963

- Yvonne Rainer
- Sylvia Marlowe
- Frank Paris Marionette Opera. Wolfgang Amadeus Mozart's Bastien und Bastienne. Joseph Haydn's Philemon und Baucis.
- Galimir String Quartet ??
- Kroll String Quartet ??
- New American Cinema ??
- Fernando Valenti
- Tina Brown
- Judson Dance Theater
- Claremont Quartet
- Pamela Cook
- Robert Conant
- Helen Boatwright
- Sanford Allen
- Daniel Weisman
- Suzanne Bloch

=== 1964 ===
- Peter Serkin and Michael Tree
- Lucinda Childs
- Judson Dance Theater
- Kroll String Quartet ?
- Gallimard Quartet
- New American Cinema ??

=== 1965 ===
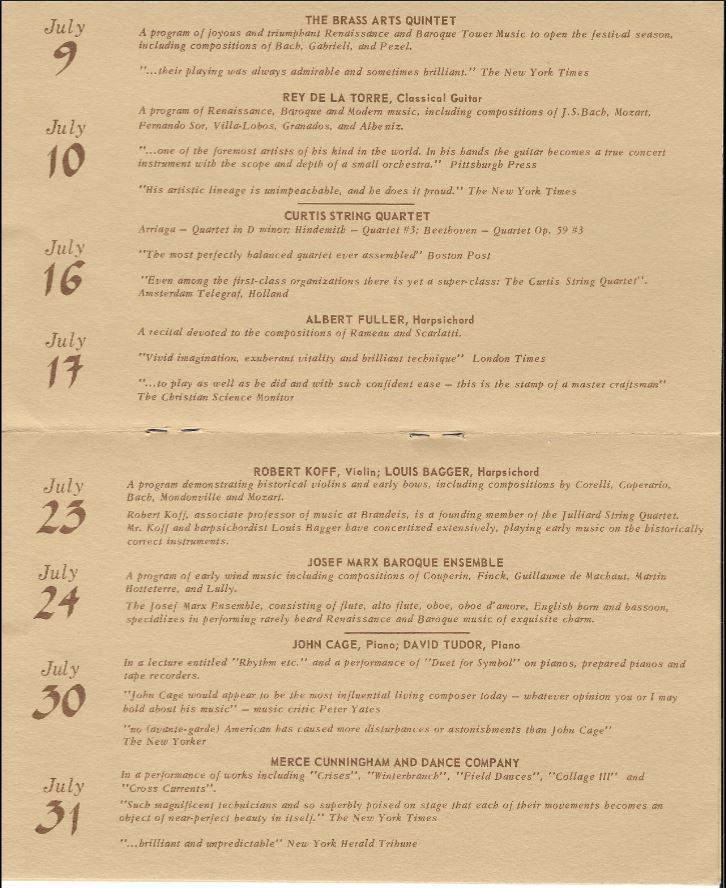
Sundance program from 1965

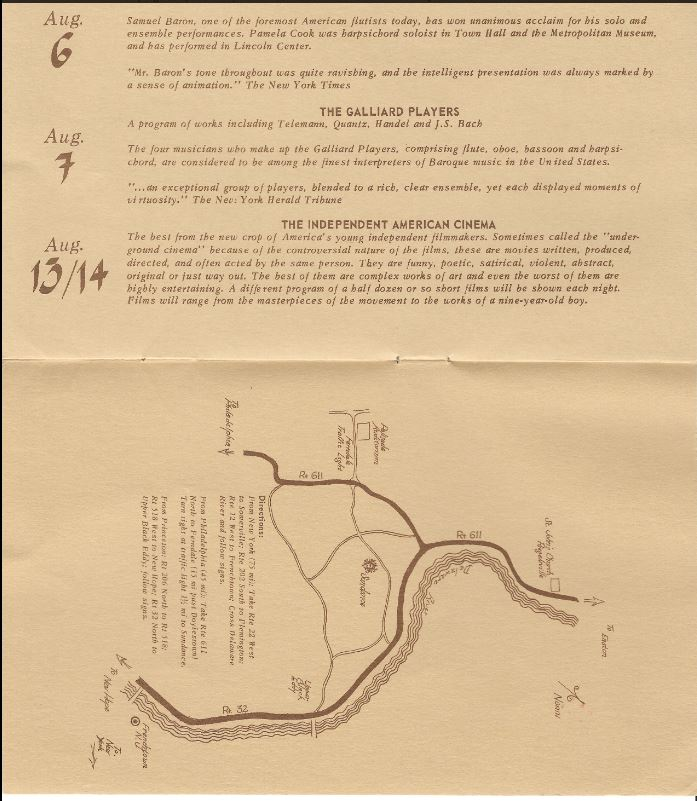
Sundance program from 1965

- The Brass Arts Quartet
- Rey de la Torre, Classical guitar
- Curtis String Quartet.
- Albert Fuller, harpsichord.
- Robert Koff, violin, and Louis Bagger, harpsichord.
- Joseph Marx Baroque Ensemble.
- John Cage, piano. David Tudor, piano
- Merce Cunningham and Dance Company

=== 1966 ===
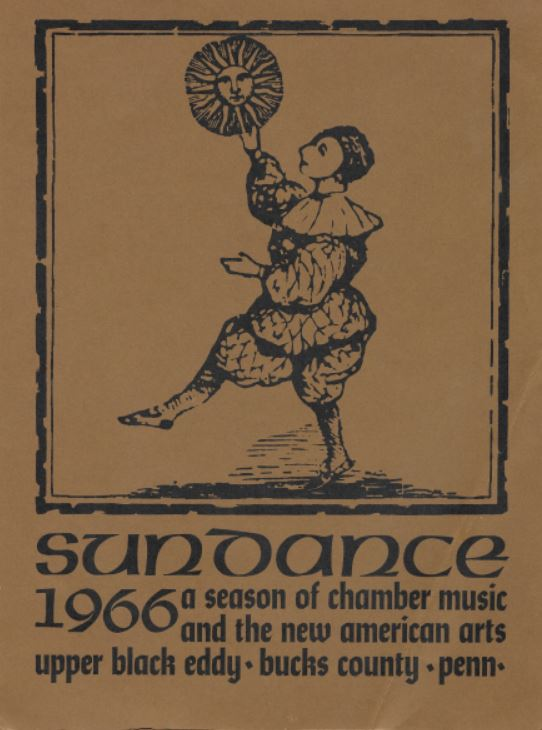
Program cover from 1966

- Judson Chamber Ensemble.(2 concerts)
- Beverly Smith/Roberts Blossoms – Filmstages
- The Open Theater – "Viet rock"
- The Festival Winds
- Judson Poets Theater
- Claremont String Quartet (3 concerts)
- New American Cinema.
- La MaMa Repertory. – Chicago
- Allen Ginsberg/Peter Ganesh Orlovsky – Poems
- New York Chamber Soloists.
- Katherine Litz and Aileen Passloff/Remy Charlip
- Paul Jacobs, harpsichord.
- Al Carmines – theater songs
- Joseph Marx Baroque Ensemble
- La Monte Young – Experiments
- Cecil Taylor Trio
- Manhattan Festival Ballet

For additional information:

=== 1967 ===
- July 19: Fernando Valenti, harpsichord, in a recital of Spanish Baroque music including works by Scarlatti and Soler
- July 20: Robert Schwartz: X-ing, a multiform dance work—assemblages, moments, improvisations—performed by the choreographer with Delila Zuck and others
- July 26: Opera Bluestocking: "In a Garden", by Meyer Kupferman and Gertrude Stein; "The Secular Mask" by William Boyce; and "The Fortress of Ares" by Bela Bartok
- July 27: Princeton String Quartet: Haydn's "Seven Last Words of Christ", in mourning for all the victims of the war in Vietnam
- August 2: James Oliver Buswell IV, violin, and Fernando Valenti, harpsichord, in a program of sonatas by Bach
- August 3: "The Hawk", by Murray Mednick and Tony Barsha, a radical experiment in improvisational ritual theatre, with the original off-off-Broadway cast
- August 4: Student recital: works for one, two, and three harpsichords, performance by advanced students of Fernando Valenti's Sundance master classes
- August 9: New York Chamber Soloists: piano quartets and piano trios by Haydn, Mozart, and Schumann
- August 10: New York Chamber Soloists: all-contemporary program including the Harpsichord Concerto by Manuel de Falla and the Sonata for Flute, Oboe, Cello, and Harpsichord by Elliott Carter
- August 16: The Gift Rite: Ken Dewey Action Theatre in a jazz/medieval collision with the myth of fire—a happening
- August 17–18: New American Cinema
- August 25–56: "Poppy Nogood" by Terry Riley, "Medicine Dance" by Trisha Brown, "Shirt" by R. Whitman, Ravi Shankar

=== 1968 ===
- July 19: Fernando Valenti, harpsichord, in a recital of Spanish Baroque music including works by Scarlatti and Soler
- July 20: Robert Schwartz: X-ing, a multiform dance work—assemblages, moments, improvisations—performed by the choreographer with Delila Zuck and others
- July 26: Opera Bluestocking: "In a Garden", by Meyer Kupferman and Gertrude Stein; "The Secular Mask" by William Boyce; and "The Fortress of Ares" by Bela Bartok
- July 27: Princeton String Quartet: Haydn's "Seven Last Words of Christ", in mourning for all the victims of the war in Vietnam
- August 2: James Oliver Buswell IV, violin, and Fernando Valenti, harpsichord, in a program of sonatas by Bach
- August 3: "The Hawk", by Murray Mednick and Tony Barsha, a radical experiment in improvisational ritual theatre, with the original off-off-Broadway cast
- August 4: Student recital: works for one, two, and three harpsichords, performance by advanced students of Fernando Valenti's Sundance master classes
- August 9: New York Chamber Soloists: piano quartets and piano trios by Haydn, Mozart, and Schumann
- August 10: New York Chamber Soloists: all-contemporary program including the Harpsichord Concerto by Manuel de Falla and the Sonata for Flute, Oboe, Cello, and Harpsichord by Elliott Carter
- August 16: The Gift Rite: Ken Dewey Action Theatre in a jazz/medieval collision with the myth of fire—a happening
- August 17–18: New American Cinema

== Commentaries ==
From Michael Townsend Smith:

Zuckermann had done three summer seasons at Sundance with an English friend Eric Britton who had now moved to Paris. Deep in the woods in northern Bucks County, Pennsylvania, two hours west of New York, they had built a small covered stage and a wide amphitheatre for the audience that was open to the stars. It was extremely charming, and we presented a wondrous range of artists over the next three summers. Farther up the drive beyond the theatre, there were two houses, a barn, a tennis court, a big concrete swimming down in the woods, and a screened-in summer house. Wolfgang and I got to be good friends, playing chamber music together in the city and tennis at Sundance. The performers often came for the weekend and enjoyed the facilities. For our third season the great Catalan harpsichord Fernando Valenti was in residence, and Wolfgang fixed up the horse stalls as practice rooms for his students. But the following year, appalled by America's political power, Wolfgang sold Sundance and moved abroad. He presently owns and operates Librairie Shakespeare, a bookshop in Avignon.

From Eric Britton, Paris:

Years later (February 2018) I have come to regret that Wolfgang and I designed Sundance and the program in light of our own particular tastes and preferences (one might say a bit elitist). In retrospect I rather wish that we had spread our wings a bit and welcomed other less erudite performing arts forms to help us engage a wider audience and permanence.
Despite our extending the focus from our original point of departure (chamber music and that's it!) to house and welcome performances of modern dance, Off-Broadway plays and what we then called The New American Cinema (low cost experimental and student productions), I have come to think in retrospect that we should have stretched further: different shades of jazz, audience singing, and poetry slams. Perhaps the next time around?
