= Barbara Braathen =

American art dealer, curator, and art writer

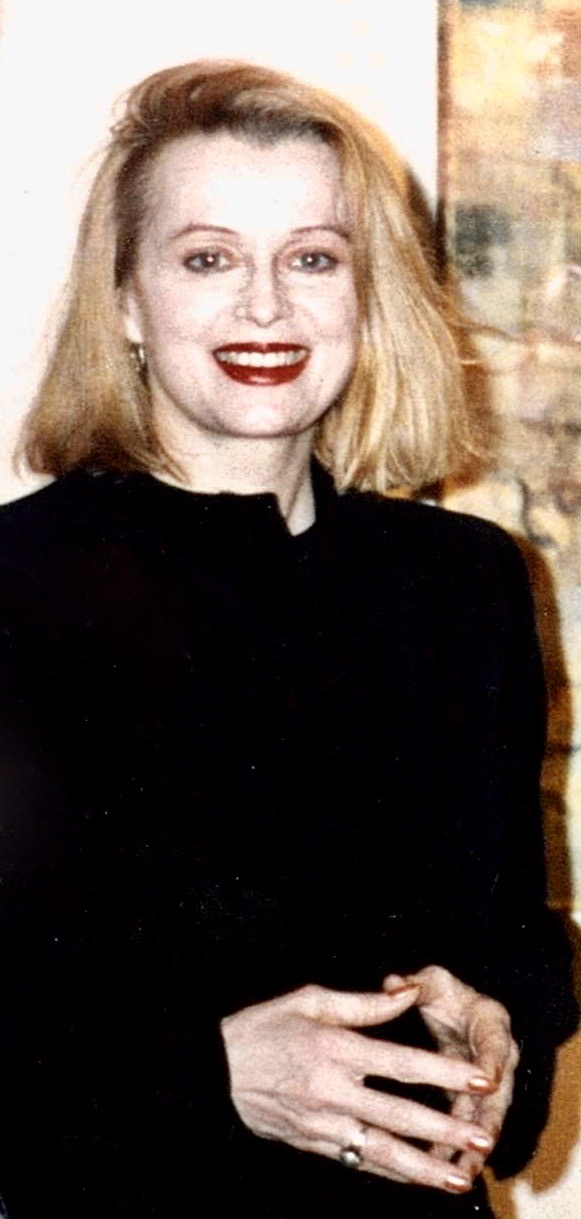
- Born: North Dakota, US
- Occupations: Art Dealer, Gallerist, Curator
- Known for: Contemporary Art

Barbara Braathen is an American art dealer, gallerist and curator. She owned galleries of contemporary art in New York from 1980 to 2005.

== Biography ==
From 1980 to 1983, Barbara Braathen operated Braathen-Gallozzi Fine Art in New York City with Guillaume Gallozzi. This became the Barbara Braathen Gallery, which was active in Lower Manhattan until 1998. From 2000 to 2005, she owned River Gallery in upstate New York.

Braathen's exhibition program encompasses an eclectic mix of contemporary art. This includes urban artist Rammellzee, French language artist Guy de Cointet, spiritual expressionist Hunt Slonem, debris and found object sculptor Donald Lipski, surrealist poet Charles Henri Ford, actor-artist Fred Gwynne, and Mexican-American painter Raul Guerrero.

A highlight for Braathen was the Surrealismo exhibition in 1986 curated with legendary art dealer,Leo Castelli.

Barbara Braathen was born in North Dakota in 1944 and began selling her own paintings by the age of 14. By 1973, she received her PhDc in Modern Art History from the University of California, Los Angeles. Braathen's special interest is in artists addressing the Spiritual in Art, from Symbolists to Wassily Kandinsky and Hilma af Klint to present day creators.
