= Gordon Watson (pianist) =

Australian classical pianist and teacher

Gordon Charles Watson AM (28 February 1921 – 16 April 1999) was an Australian classical pianist and teacher. He taught at the Sydney Conservatorium of Music from 1964 to 1986, retiring as Head of the Keyboard Department.

== Early life ==
Gordon Charles Watson was born in Parkes, New South Wales in 1921. He served with the Australian Imperial Force for four years in World War II.

He studied piano under Laurence Godfrey Smith in Sydney, and later had advanced studies at Mills College, Oakland, California with Egon Petri (piano), and Darius Milhaud (composition).

== Career ==
As early as 1943, commentators such as Neville Cardus were noticing that his piano playing, while showing great skill and promise, revealed the soul of someone other than a performer (Cardus suggested composing or conducting might be Watson's natural bents).

Watson spent some years living in the United Kingdom as a touring performer. On 22 October 1951, to celebrate the 140th anniversary of the birth of Franz Liszt, he performed the complete Transcendental Études in a concert at the Wigmore Hall. On that occasion he also premiered Humphrey Searle's Piano Sonata, Op. 21, written for the occasion. (The sonata was loosely based on Liszt's Sonata in B minor and has been described as "probably, both the finest and most original piano work ever produced by a British composer".) Watson later recorded the sonata, but the recording was quickly deleted. In 1957 he was able to introduce Searle to his teacher Egon Petri. Watson wrote the sleeve notes for the LP recording of classic Egon Petri performances issued by EMI in 1967 as number 7 in its Great Instrumentalists series.

In 1951 he was chosen by Constant Lambert to play the difficult piano part in the premiere of his final ballet, Tiresias. In late 1952 he gave the premiere performance of Darius Milhaud's 1st Piano Concerto, in London.

In 1954/55, Watson commissioned a piano concerto from Humphrey Searle (his first), but was unable to be the soloist at the premiere at the Cheltenham Festival in July 1955 as he was touring in Australia. He did, however, premiere Searle's 2nd Piano Concerto, Op. 27, on 14 August 1956, at the Royal Albert Hall, with the BBC Symphony Orchestra under John Hollingsworth. On 20 August 1956 Watson and Thea King gave the first performance of Humphrey Searle's Suite for Clarinet and Piano.

In 1958 on a visit home to Sydney he was asked by Winifred Burston, a renowned piano teacher at the Sydney Conservatorium of Music, to assess the young Larry Sitsky's skills. He did so, and he and Burston jointly formed the view that Sitsky would benefit from study with Egon Petri, who accepted him as a pupil. Sitsky went on to study with Petri for over three years, from May 1958 until the end of 1961. In 1950 in London he also gave some months of lessons to another of Burston's pupils, Geofrey Parsons.

Gordon Watson played the solo piano part of Brian Easdale's score for the controversial 1960 Michael Powell film Peeping Tom.

In 1964 Sir Bernard Heinze appointed Watson to succeed Winifred Burston on the teaching staff of the Sydney Conservatorium. He was the head of the Keyboard Department until 1986, being succeeded by Elizabeth Powell. His students included: Gerard Willems, Michael Kieran Harvey, Stephanie McCallum (she dedicated her album "Perfume: The Exquisite Piano Music of France" to her teacher Gordon Watson), Elena Kats-Chernin, Carey Beebe, Barry Walmsley, Brennan Keats, Garry Laycock (1944–88; who also used the professional name Leon Gibbons), Romano Crivici and Peter Carthew.

He was a juror for the Sydney International Piano Competition in 1981 and 1985.

The Australian pedagogue and composer Alex Burnard (1900–1971), a student of Ralph Vaughan Williams, wrote a set of Twelve Folk-Songs Settings for Watson.

Gordon Watson died in Sydney on 16 April 1999. An obituary appeared in The Sydney Morning Herald on 27 April.

== Honours ==
Gordon Watson was appointed a Member of the Order of Australia (AM) in the Australia Day Honours of 1987, for his services to music as a performer and teacher.

== Recordings ==
Gordon Watson recorded:

- Benjamin Britten: The Holy Sonnets of John Donne, with Alexander Young, tenor. Argo RG 25 (1954)
- Frederick Delius: songs ("Autumn", "Cradle Song", "Evening Voices", "In the Seraglio Garden", "Let Springtime Come", "Love's Philosophy", "The Nightingale Has a Lyre of Gold"), with Joan Stuart (soprano)|Joan Stuart, soprano; 2 other songs. Argo RG 46 (1957?)
- Horace Keats: (1972) songs, with the mezzo-soprano Lauris Elms.
- Constant Lambert: Concerto for Pianoforte and Nine Instruments. Argo RG 50 (1955)
- Heinrich Marschner: (1952) Trio in F major, Op. 167, with Granville Jones (violin) and Norina Semino (cello)
- Roger Quilter: Song Cycle To Julia; Seven Elizabethan Lyrics; Three Songs by Shelley, with Alexander Young. Argo RG 36 (1954)
- Humphrey Searle: Piano Sonata, Op. 21 (Watson had given the world premiere performance in 1951)
- Ralph Vaughan Williams: On Wenlock Edge with Alexander Young and the Sebastian String Quartet. Argo RG 20 (1953)
- Vaughan Williams: Seven Songs from The Pilgrim's Progress, with John Cameron, baritone; Patricia Bartlett (soprano)|Patricia Bartlett, soprano; Iris Kells, soprano. Argo RG 20 (1953)
- Peter Warlock: The Curlew with Alexander Young, tenor; Lionel Solomon, flute; Peter Graeme, English horn; and the Sebastian String Quartet. Argo RG 26 (1954)
- (1955) piano pieces by Roy Agnew, Horace Keats and Alex Burnard.
