= Michael Townsend Smith =

American dramatist (born 1935)

Michael Townsend Smith (born October 5, 1935) is an American playwright, theatre director, impresario, critic, and lighting designer.

== Life and career ==
Smith was born in Kansas City, Missouri, and received his primary education in Kansas City. He then went to the Hotchkiss School and to Yale University.

He was a theatre critic for The Village Voice during the 1960s and early 1970s, and was active in the development of Off-Off-Broadway theatre in New York City. He also worked as a director, playwright, and lighting designer during this time. Smith directed early works by Sam Shepard, Ronald Tavel, María Irene Fornés, Emanuel Peluso, Jean-Claude van Itallie, Soren Agenoux, H. M. Koutoukas, and William M. Hoffman, and others. He also directed some of his own plays, and works by Samuel Beckett, Edward Albee, Christopher Fry, and Gertrude Stein.

During the 1960s, Smith interviewed Wolfgang Zuckermann, noted manufacturer and scholar of harpsichords, for The Village Voice. They became friends and collaborated on projects in the performing arts. These projects included the Sundance Festival of the Chamber Arts (a performing arts festival in rural Pennsylvania), as well as an unsuccessful attempt to revive the Caffe Cino, an early off-off-Broadway theater located near Zuckermann's workshop in Greenwich Village. In the 1980s, Smith himself began to make harpsichords and fortepianos.

In the 1990s, Smith was the editor of Santa Barbara Magazine and founded Genesis West, a theatre company in Santa Barbara. They presented Smith's own plays and plays by Shepard, Fornes, and George F. Walker. He also worked as the arts editor of the Santa Barbara Independent and the music and dance critic for the Santa Barbara News-Press. In 2003, he moved to Silverton, Oregon, where he is affiliated with the Brush Creek Playhouse.

== Selected works and credits ==
Smith's plays include Captain Jack's Revenge, Country Music, Cowgirl Ecstasy, Heavy Pockets, and Half Life. A number of his early plays were produced at La MaMa Experimental Theatre Club, an off-off-Broadway theatre in the East Village of Manhattan. These included The Next Thing (1966), directed by Jacques Levy and presented by The Open Theater at La MaMa; Captain Jack's Revenge (1970), which Smith dedicated to Joe Cino; and Prussian Suite, which featured music by John Smead and was in aid of H.M. Koutoukas.

He also worked on a number of other productions at La MaMa during the 1960s and 1970s. He directed Emanuel Peluso's Hurricane of the Eye and contributed slides to Robert Schwartz's Nova, both in 1969. He then did lighting for Tom Murrin's Cock-Strong and Son of Cock-Strong, both directed by John Vaccaro in 1970. Also in 1970 he did lighting for Jackie Curtis' Heaven Grand in Amber Orbit, which was performed by the Playhouse of the Ridiculous. Smith wrote the libretto for John Herbert McDowell's opera A Dog's Love, and played harpsichord in the 1971 production. A Dog's Love was produced alongside Smith's play Tony, performed by Lucy Silvay. In 1973, he contributed to John Patrick Dodd's City of Light. In 1991, he did the lighting design for a production of Jean-Claude van Itallie's Ancient Boys directed by Gregory Keller.

More, More, More, I Want More was a three-minute play Smith wrote with Remy Charlip and Johnny Dodd. They wrote the play for Joyce Aaron to perform at a 1965 benefit for La MaMa to upgrade its electrical wiring and devices. The performance, called BbAaNnGg and organized by playwright Robert Patrick, consisted of over 25 three-minute skits and was reviewed by Smith in his Theatre Journal column. Smith also directed Charles Stanley and Ondine in a scene from a Koutoukas play at a production to benefit Koutoukas at La MaMa in 1974.

== See also ==
- List of playwrights from the United States
