= Joe La Placa =

American art dealer in London

Joe La Placa (b. New York in 1959) is an American art dealer in London and senior director, partner of Cardi Gallery, London.

== Early life and education ==
La Placa started out in New York as an artist and then, perhaps because of a more scientific or technical mindset, which he himself attributed in later interviews to the influence of his family (his father was a physicist), he migrated toward fabrication. (Note: In art, a "fabricator" is someone who builds things for artists—a technical production specialist, bringing together diverse skills such as woodworking, metalworking, shop engineering and more, as required for producing and/or installing large or challenging pieces—although the scale of the work of art is not sole determinant of whether fabrication services are needed.)

In 1976 he attended the School of Visual Arts in New York as the winner of the four-year long Silas B. Rhodes Presidential Scholarship Award. Studying with Keith Haring, he became close friends with the artist became immersed in the artsy downtown scene of New York, as La Placa described in an interview with the Mayfair Art Weekend as "living in the Renaissance". While attending the School of Visual Arts, La Placa worked as an assistant for Jean Michel Basquiat, Julian Schnabel amongst many others.

== Career ==
In 1980 Joe La Placa worked for the gallery Sperone Westwater with key members of the Italian Transavantgarde such as Francesco Clemente, Enzo Cucchi and Sandro Chia.

A friend of the legendary Jean Michel Basquiat, La Placa worked as his studio assistant and helped set up his first solo show Worked at Annina Nosei Gallery 100 Prince Street.

As gallerist, writer and arts organization innovator, La Placa first became noted in the 1980s as a promoter and exhibitor of graffiti, especially as co-founder of the Gallozzi-La Placa Gallery (New York) with Guillaume Gallozzi in New York's TriBeCa. The gallery worked with leading graffiti artists (in some contexts producers of graffiti are referred to as "writers" (Note: The emergence of "graffiti" as the dominant term describing the universe of artistic works that comprise both the unpermitted "tagging" of urban public spaces on the one hand, and on the other hand gallery-presentable renderings on canvas or other vehicle in a similar graphic style, is complex. The originators of the urban tagging movement did not call what they produced graffiti, and did not think of themselves as graffiti artists. To the extent that there was a term for what they did, it was called "writing," and they referred to themselves as "writers.") ). Over the next few years the gallery worked with and represented many notable artists of the graffiti / "writing" genre, including Phase 2 (Note: Phase 2, also known as Lonny Marrow (and prev. "Lonny Wood"), is recognized as the father of the "bubble style" of graffiti lettering and as one of the fathers of New York's graffiti movement. He refers to graffiti on trains, buildings, etc. as "aerosol writing." Of more current interest, as of 11/2013 he was the plaintiff in a lawsuit against Jacob Javits Center et al. for either misplacing or allowing the destruction of his sculpture called Misconceptions of an A. The sculpture was loaned to and had been on display at the Javits Center until its disappearance. Originally Misconceptions of an A had been commissioned (1984) by Joe La Placa, who however had given up rights to the art work (in 1988) and is not a party to the lawsuit.), Delta, Sharp, Rammellzee, ERO (Dominique Philbert), and Lee Quiñones. The focus of the gallery later diversified into presenting other visual art movements, including Italian Futurists, the Hudson River School, and British surrealists.

A photo spread and article on Gallozzi-La Placa Gallery, in Italian Vogue magazine from 1984, showed the partners standing inside a loft style studio surrounded by graffiti works in progress, sending the message that the gallerists were part of the scene, not just on the exhibitor side, but on the production side as well. Gallozzi and La Placa also excelled in marketing, and had a successful visit to the prestigious Basel Art Fair in 1984, a graffiti marketing coup that gained them respect—and clients—in Europe. La Placa later wrote: "Invited to mount an exhibition at the Basel Art Fair of 1984, my partner Guillaume Gallozzi and I sold 72 paintings and 40 drawings in three days. An ironic outcome, given that we flew to Switzerland with $50 between us and left with over $250,000, much of it in cash." In addition to graffiti, from 1985 on the gallery started showing Italian Futurists, the Hudson River school and British artists as well.

The gallery was operational until the late 1980s, after which La Placa moved to France and worked in IT (information technology) for about four years. In the early 1990s, motivated by a desire to get back into art, he relocated to London, where he dealt in British modernists, years he described as being difficult. He became the foreign editor for Art Review and also, still in London, which was now becoming more prominent as the hub for contemporary art, he wrote for Artnet. In the meantime his former partner Guillaume Gallozzi had died in 1995 in Paris, aged 37.

La Placa spent some years as Foreign Editor for ArtReview and as the chief London representative and writer for Artnet, the online art auctions company. In 2007, with hedge fund mogul Mike Platt, head of BlueCrest Capital Management, La Placa co-founded All Visual Arts (AVA) a London-based gallery and arts patronage organization capitalized by the hedge fund and considered by some reviewers to represent a new direction in how visual arts are produced and represented.

== Producer and patron ==
In 2007, still in London, Joe La Placa joined forces with hedge fund billionaire Mike Platt, former J.P. Morgan Managing Director, to establish All Visual Arts. From its inception AVA represented an attempt to build a new type of arts organization. According to reports the enterprise was initially funded by £5 million from Platt's hedge fund (one of the largest in Europe), with the idea of creating a "hybrid" gallery and patronage organization that would commission works from known artists: the gallery as producer and collector. AVA has been widely reviewed and its initial exhibitions were considered successes. The "Age of the Marvelous" show that took place in 2009 in the crypt of a deconsecrated house of worship (former Holy Trinity Church) in central London serves as an example, though the show was marked by its "visual shocks" ("not for children" according to Godfrey Barker, arts reviewer of the London Evening Standard), due to works which included a gorilla mounted on a crucifix—none of which has detracted from the generally positive attention AVA has received, nor from a certain sense of inspiration about its mission. In interviews at the "Age of the Marvelous" opening Joe La Placa described AVA's approach as harking back to a "late 16th, early 17th Century method of collecting," an ambition of which was to provide "an almost cosmological view into man's knowledge in one room." He described AVA itself as "a new hybrid model for the production of art, which doesn't lock us into a sort of normal gallery system where you have a gallery, a shop," adding "I'm not interested in being a shop owner, I'm interested in producing art." AVA is currently located at 1 Horse Guards Avenue, in the Whitehall area of London.

In 2015, La Placa was the Chief Advisor for the Jean-Michel Basquiat retrospective "Boom for Real" at the Barbican Centre in London.
