= Guillaume Gallozzi =

French art dealer (1958–1995)

Guillaume Gallozzi (11 February 1958, in Aix-en-Provence – 25 December 1995, in Paris) was a French art dealer associated with graffiti art. He lived and worked in New York and rose to prominence in the 1980s and '90s through his promotion of graffiti pioneers and, later, of British art. He had a reputation for being quixotic, brilliant and stylish ("more worthy of a novel than a brief obituary," per The Independent), and played a role in the careers of significant artists such as Jean-Michel Basquiat, Keith Haring, Stan Peskett and Steven Sykes. In 1980, he opened Braathen-Gallozzi Fine Art with Barbara Braathen at 76 Duane Street in New York City and presented the first significant solo exhibition of Stan Peskett's installation art in 1981. In 1983, Gallozzi and partner Joe La Placa (the latter went on to found All Visual Arts in London in 2007) opened the Gallozzi-La Placa Gallery in TriBeCa. Gallozzi continued to represent Peskett’s work as his dealer well into the 1990s.

In the mid-1980s Gallozzi diversified into representing Italian Futurists, the Hudson River School and British surrealists, and mounted notable exhibitions until 1988, when the Gallozzi-La Placa Gallery ceased active operations. In the meantime, however, Stan Peskett had introduced Gallozzi to the drama of war art, specifically to British war artists and, in 1989, working with The British Council USA (cultural department of the British Embassy in Washington DC) and its then cultural affairs officer Barbara Rosen, Gallozzi mounted a show of British war artists at the National Museum of the United States Navy in Washington DC. Several of Gallozzi's catalogs, including those on war art, are collector's items, other examples being Metamorphose: British Surrealists and Neo-romantics (1992), and Back in No Time (1994), a catalog featuring works of painter and performance artist Brion Gysin. The only criticism leveled at Gallozzi during the final few years of his life is that his tastes had become, if anything, too sophisticated, or "decidedly récherché" as The New Yorker put it. Gallozzi died in Paris on Christmas Day, 1995, aged 37, having fought brain cancer for five years.
