= David Jacques Way =

American harpsichord builder

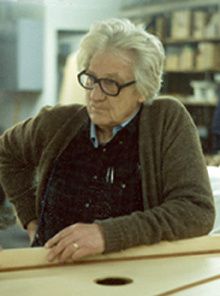
David Jacques Way in 1987

David Jacques Way (1918–1994) was an American harpsichord maker.

== Early life ==
Born in Elk Creek, Nebraska, Way was educated at Black Mountain College in North Carolina in its earliest days, where he gained his lifelong interest in graphic design and typography. His first commercial venture was the establishment in 1938 of Grafix Press in nearby Lake Eden, with fellow Black Mountain College student Emil Willimetz. After leaving the college, he began his working life as a fine-arts printer and publisher. In 1953, he entered partnership with the graphic designer Bertram L. Clarke to form Clarke & Way, consolidating a collaboration which began four years previously with work on the production of the twelve volume catalog of the Frick Collection.

== Harpsichord maker ==
Way came to harpsichord making relatively late in his life. After having built a harpsichord kit by Wolfgang Zuckermann in the late 1960s, Way wrote the "Appendix—By a Harpsichord Kit Builder" for Zuckermann's book The Modern Harpsichord, which was published in 1969 by Way's own company, October House Inc. When Zuckermann prepared to leave the United States soon afterwards, Way sensed a career change, purchased Zuckermann Harpsichords Inc and moved its premises from New York City to the historic seaside village of Stonington, Connecticut.

Beginning his evolution of new harpsichord designs based on more historic principles of construction, Way visited European museums and engaged William Hyman—one of the highly regarded American harpsichord makers in Zuckermann's book—as consultant and teacher. The rapid development of the historic harpsichord in this decade was fuelled by the popularity of the harpsichord kit, produced by several companies including Zuckermann and the Boston-based Hubbard Harpsichords Inc.

During the 1970s, Way gradually abandoned the more usual modern materials of plywood, hard steel wire and zither tuning pins. At this time, Stonington was the prototype and custom instrument shop while the Zuckermann kits were mass-produced by a facility in Philadelphia. When William Hyman died unexpectedly in 1976, Way was charged with the posthumous completion of several outstanding orders with the assistance of Hyman's last apprentice John Bennett, who remained in Stonington to preside over a dozen workers as foreman through 1990.

Way developed a large network of domestic and international Agents who liaised with musicians and distributed the instruments and kits worldwide. In 1983, Stonington took over full-time production of smaller runs of the Zuckermann kits, while continuing to complete the custom-finished instruments signed D. Jacques Way. In the late 1980s he formalised his cross-Atlantic partnership with French harpsichord maker Marc Ducornet, after which many instruments were signed D. Jacques Way & Marc Ducornet.

He died of a heart attack in his workshop on February 4, 1994.

== Philosophy ==
Way did not try to make exact copies of old instruments but rather learn from historical makers:

We have not made any 'exact copies' of particular old instruments—that seems to us to be a blind alley that leads to 'fake antiques', worthless imitations. [...] We cannot find that any of the old masters ever copied anyone, not even themselves. They did, however, learn from one another, and take everything of value they could make their own—and by making it their own they paid all debts. [...] We would rather copy the very central idea of all honest builders, ancient and modern: Using the materials available and all the knowledge and sensitivity and research and awareness we can muster, make musical instruments for the sound and action of which we take complete responsibility.

As a master instrument maker, he was always perfecting his craft and focused on the sound of his instruments:

There are no 'secrets' to the making of a fine instrument, but there are degrees of understanding. [...] You must understand the music, the tradition you are working in, the materials, and you must be able to hear and remember instrumental sound, to think in terms of sound the way a composer thinks about harmony and counterpoint. [...] You need intimate contact with the finest professional musicians (without maximum drivers to test the machine, you cannot make a maximum machine). You need access to the finest materials—you cannot make a fine instrument from lumber you buy in the local lumber yard, nor with wire you buy from the hardware store. You must make enough instruments so that you can compare, learn and remember; one person working all by himself cannot learn this trade in one lifetime.

== Legacy ==
Harpsichords by David Way remain in regular use in many educational institutions and by orchestras worldwide, and are played by many leading harpsichordists including Trevor Pinnock (who has said of his instrument "it is modelled somewhat after Hemsch, but the sound is completely David Way"). Harpsichord makers who David Way mentored include Carey Beebe, Marc Ducornet, F. Jacob Kaeser, Kevin Fryer, Edward Kottick, Gerald Self and Kevin Spindler. Several of Way's designs are still produced by Zuckermann Harpsichords International, which continues today under the direction of Richard Auber. Way's legacy is also his encouragement of the thousands of amateur musicians and people from all walks of life who discovered the harpsichord through building their own instrument from a Zuckermann kit.
