= All Visual Arts =

Coordinates: 51°31′52.9″N 0°7′12.3″W

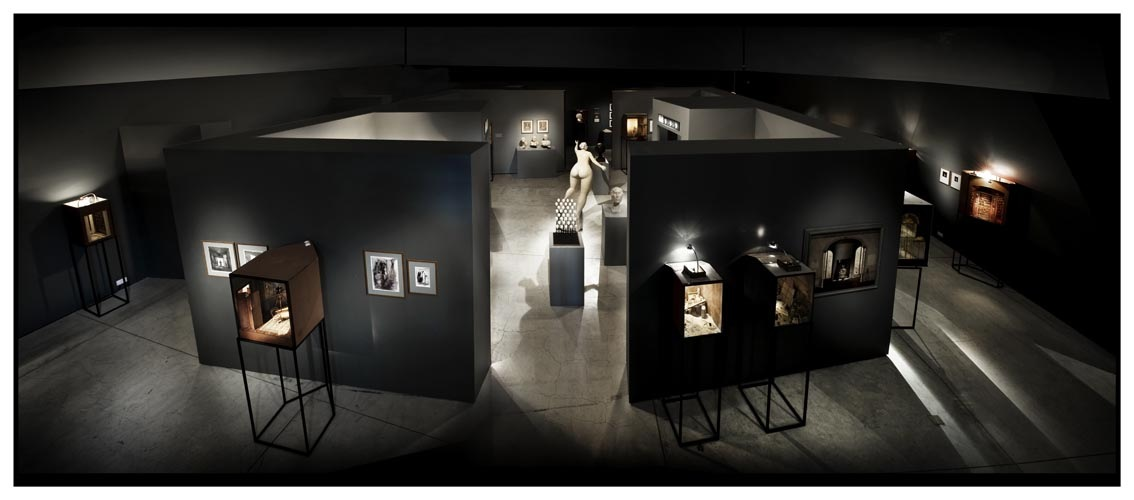
An installation shot of Charles Matton's Enclosures in 2011

All Visual Arts is a contemporary arts organisation founded in 2007 by gallerist and writer Joe La Placa, and Mike Platt.

Prior to co-founding All Visual Arts, La Placa ran the Gallozzi-La Placa gallery with Guillaume Gallozzi in New York in the 1980s. La Placa claims he was first to exhibit artists such as Keith Haring and graffiti artist Jean-Michel Basquiat, however there is no evidence of this other than an interview given by La Placa himself; La Placa later worked as a writer and editor for Art Review based in London as well as the director of artnet.com in the UK. All Visual Arts functions as both a gallery and a private collection, commissioning works from the artists, and subsequently placing them in collections including François Pinault's.

Major exhibitions organized by All Visual Arts include 'The Age of the Marvellous' in 2009 at the Holy Trinity Church in Marylebone, and 'Vanitas: The Transience of Earthly Pleasure' at 33 Great Portland Place in 2010, showcasing artists such as Turner Prize nominees Jake and Dinos Chapman, Reece Jones, Polly Morgan, Tim Noble and Sue Webster, as well as Turner Prize winner Keith Tyson. Mark Sanders, a former arts editor for Dazed & Confused, has joined All Visual Arts as a director.

In September 2010, All Visual Arts moved to its permanent gallery space, a 5,000 square foot former bus depot at 2 Omega Place, Kings Cross.
