= Juan Crisóstomo Arriaga =

Spanish composer (1806–1826)

Juan Crisóstomo Jacobo Antonio de Arriaga y Balzola
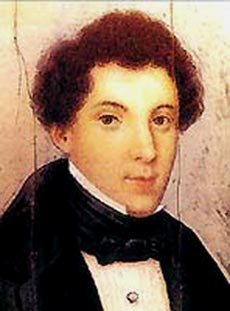
- Juan Crisóstomo Arriaga
- Born: 27 January 1806; Bilbao, Spain
- Died: 17 January 1826 (aged 19); Paris, France
- Occupation: Composer
- Parent: Juan Simón de Arriaga

Juan Crisóstomo Jacobo Antonio de Arriaga y Balzola (27 January 1806 – 17 January 1826) was a Spanish Basque composer. He was nicknamed "the Spanish Mozart" after he died, because, like Wolfgang Amadeus Mozart, he was both a child prodigy and an accomplished composer who died young. They also shared the same first and second baptismal names; and they shared the same birthday (due to both having been born on the feast of St. John Chrysostom), 27 January (fifty years apart).

== Life ==
Juan Crisóstomo Arriaga was born in Bilbao, Biscay, on what would have been Mozart's fiftieth birthday. His father (Juan Simón de Arriaga) and the boy's older brother first taught him music. Juan Simón had some musical talent and at age seventeen Juan Crisóstomo was an organist at a church in Berriatúa. Juan Simón worked in Guernica and in 1804 moved to Bilbao and became a merchant in wool, rice, wax, coffee and other commodities. The income generated in this way allowed Juan Simón to think about providing his son, who had shown prodigious musical talent, a way of developing those gifts.

In September 1821, Arriaga's father, with the encouragement of composer José Sobejano y Ayala (1791–1857), sent Juan Crisóstomo to Paris, where in November of that year Arriaga began his studies. These included violin under Pierre Baillot, counterpoint with Luigi Cherubini and harmony under François-Joseph Fétis at the Paris Conservatoire. From all evidence, Arriaga made quite an impression on his teachers. In 1823, Cherubini, who had become director at the Conservatoire the previous year, famously asked on hearing the young composer's Stabat Mater, "Who wrote this?" and learning it was Arriaga, said to him, "Amazing – you are music itself."

Arriaga soon became a teaching assistant in Fétis's class, noted and highly praised both by fellow students and other faculty at the Conservatoire for his talent. Cherubini referred to Arriaga's fugue for eight voices (lost) based on the Credo ... et vitam venturi simply as "a masterpiece", and Fétis was no less effusive — apparently, what impressed all his mentors was his use of sophisticated harmonies, counterpoint and fugue with minimal or no formal instruction. Fétis was already familiar with Arriaga's now-lost opera Los Esclavos Felices ("The Happy Slaves"), (Note: Of the opera Los Esclavos Felices; only the overture – about 8 minutes long – survives. The libretto was written by Luciano Francisco Comella in thirty parts, of which four have survived.) stating that "without any knowledge whatsoever of harmony, Juan Crisóstomo wrote a Spanish opera containing wonderful and completely original ideas." Arriaga was well supported during his four years in Paris by his father, but the intensity of his commitment to his studies at the Conservatoire and his meteoric rise, based on his teachers' compliments and assessments of his promise, may have taken a toll on his health: he died in Paris ten days before his twentieth birthday, of a lung ailment (possibly tuberculosis), or exhaustion, perhaps both. He was buried in an unmarked grave in the Montmartre Cemetery. Thanks to the Spanish Embassy, since 1977 there has been a plaque marking the house at 314 rue Saint-Honoré in memory of the composer.

== Music ==
The amount of Arriaga's music that has survived to the present day is quite small, reflecting his early death. It includes:

- Opera: Arriaga wrote an opera, Los esclavos felices ("The Happy Slaves"), in 1820 when he was fourteen. It was produced in Bilbao. Only the overture and some fragments have survived.
- Symphony: Arriaga composed a Symphony in D for Large Orchestra (Sinfonía a gran orquesta), which uses D major and D minor so equally that it is not in either key.
- String quartets: At the age of 16, Arriaga wrote three string quartets that were published in 1824, and were the only works of his published during his lifetime.
- Other works: Arriaga also wrote the following:
  - An octet, Nada y mucho scored for String Quartet, Bass, Trumpet, Guitar and Piano.
  - Pieces of church music: a Mass (lost), Stabat Mater, Salve Regina, Et vitam venturi saeculi (lost), cantatas (Agar, Erminia, All' Aurora, Patria)
  - Instrumental compositions: a nonet, Tres Estudios de Character for piano, La Húngara for violin and piano, Variations for String Quartet and numerous Romances

Arriaga's music was used to create an opera pasticcio, Die arabische Prinzessin. The work was commissioned by the Barenboim-Said Foundation from the composer Anna-Sophie Brüning and the author Paula Fünfeck, and is based on a traditional Arabic tale. The piece was premiered under the title Die Sultana von Cadiz by the West-Eastern Divan Orchestra of the Barenboim-Said Foundation and local children's choirs at the Cultural Palace, Ramallah on 14 July 2009. The music publisher Boosey & Hawkes lists further performance runs in Leipzig (in 2011); in Bonn, Bilbao, and Barañáin (in 2013); and in Madrid, Coburg, and Linz (in 2014).

== Stature ==
The Teatro Arriaga in Bilbao is one of the centers of the August city festivals

Arriaga's music is "elegant, accomplished and notable for its harmonic warmth" (New Grove Concise Dictionary of Music). His greatest works are undoubtedly the three string quartets, which (like his predecessors', D. Scarlatti, Soler and Boccherini) contain notably Spanish ethnic rhythmic and melodic elements, especially in the galloping 6/8 finale of No. 1 in D minor and the meditative second (slow) movements of No. 2 in A major (an impressive set of variations in D major taking off from the slow D major variation movements in Mozart's K. 464 and Beethoven's Op. 18 No. 5 (both also in A major as a whole), which climaxes in a D minor variation even more passionate than Mozart's D minor variation in K. 464, in the form of an impassioned, plangent lament on the top two strings of the viola going up to the second A above middle C) and No. 3 in E-flat major (a tender G major lullaby for the newborn Christ child). Periodwise, his style is on the borderline between late Classicism and early Romanticism, ranging from the late Classical idiom of Mozart to the proto-Romanticism of early Beethoven.

According to Grove, Arriaga's death "before he was 20 was a sad loss to Basque music". Following his early death, with the only reliable biographical material at the time being some reports by Fétis, his life story was fictionalized to play into rising Basque nationalism. Data on the composer remains scarce, but in 1989 the Basque Studies program at the University of Nevada, Reno published the only English language biography of Arriaga, with appendix and bibliography of works, written by Barbara Rosen (Arriaga, the Forgotten Genius: the Short Life of a Basque Composer); and in honor of the 200th anniversary of Arriaga's birth, Scherzo, the Spanish musical magazine, published a series of articles on the composer, with updated bibliographies, in its January 2006 issue. The view that emerges from both these newer sources does not contradict what Fétis said, but emphasizes that Arriaga's early death was a loss not just to Basque culture but also to Spanish music and by extension, European classical music as a whole. According to Rosen "It is [...] possible to hear passages in Arriaga's work similar to Haydn, Mozart, Beethoven and Rossini, although he sometimes fails to achieve the complexity of these composers' more mature works. Nevertheless, Arriaga has an identifiable and original style which, in time, undoubtedly would have become more individual and more recognizably his own, possibly incorporating more Spanish and Basque than Viennese elements."

A public theatre in his home city of Bilbao carries his name.

== Selected recordings ==
- O salutaris Hostia. Stabat Mater dolorosa. Air d’Oedipe à Colone. Herminie. Air de Médée. Duo de Ma Tante Aurore. Agar dans le desert. Il Fondamento, Paul Dombrecht. Fuga Libera FUG515 2005
- Juan Crisóstomo de Arriaga (1806–1826). The complete string quartets. La Ritirata – Josetxu Obregón. Glossa GCD923102, 2014
