= Barbara Rosen =

American writer

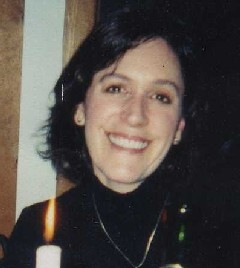
Barbara Rosen, 2003 Washington DC

Barbara Jean Rosen (born November 29, 1953) is an American author, arts administrator, events manager and fund raiser.

Born in Pittsburgh, Pennsylvania, she has lived in Europe and the United States, writing books, working in both corporate and governmental positions and as a consultant on arts projects and arts events.

== Education and early years in Europe ==
Raised in Pittsburgh, Pennsylvania, Barbara Rosen completed her undergraduate studies at McGill University, Montreal Canada, and received a master's in education from Harvard University. In 1978 Barbara met harpsichord maker and future co-author Wolfgang Zuckermann, author of The Modern Harpsichord (ISBN 0-8079-0165-2, October House), and eventually worked with him in England, France, Italy and Spain to promote the innovative Zuckermann harpsichord kit.

== Books ==
In 1980, while Barbara Rosen and Wolfgang Zuckermann were riding on the top deck of a London bus, the two came on the idea of writing a book on neglected jewels of London architecture. Hence was born The Mews of London: A Guide to the Hidden Byways of London's Past (Webb & Bower, London, 1982, ISBN 0-03-062419-3), co-authored by Zuckermann and Rosen. The book was well-researched, has been cited in scholarly articles on the subjects like the relationship of social class and the use of space, and it was favorably reviewed on BBC radio, where the authors were also interviewed. The Mews of London received "Special Mention for Originality" in the Guide Book of the Year Awards, 1983, from the London Tourist Board.

A few years later, while still living in London, Rosen recounts that she heard a riveting string orchestra composition by the precocious but obscure 19th-century Spanish musical prodigy Juan Crisóstomo de Arriaga. This led her to research the composer and the eventual result was a short biographical work – Arriaga, the Forgotten Genius: the Short Life of a Basque Composer (University of Nevada Press, Reno, June 1989, ISBN 978-1877802010). Born on January 27, 1806, exactly 50 years after the birth of Mozart, Arriaga was given the Spanish equivalent of Mozart's name, and indeed he proved to be a child prodigy. The University of Nevada Press in Reno has a noted Basque studies program and published the work, which still today remains the only English language biography of a remarkable musical genius. The book was reviewed by the venerable Joseph McLellan, music critic of The Washington Post, in a radio broadcast on WETA-FM, July 7, 1989, and the Embassy of Spain held a special reception to honor the publication of the book at Washington DC's Meridian House on November 16, 1989. As an interesting note, the author herself had invited four musicians from the National Symphony Orchestra to perform Arriaga compositions at the event, and thus was born a quartet which went on to perform for many years.

== The British Council: arts administration, curating ==
On her return to the United States from Europe, Barbara Rosen was appointed by the British Council (cultural arm of the British Embassy) in Washington DC to the position of Cultural Affairs Officer, where she worked directly for the then cultural attache, Gordon Tindale. This position involved projects by the British Council to help raise the profile of British arts and culture in the U.S. through a variety of means, including events management, arranging and facilitating exhibitions, concerts, tours and performing arts venues from the small to the large scale.

== British war artists ==
In 1990 Barbara Rosen, working with the curator of the National Museum of the United States Navy in Washington DC, helped the British Council organize an exhibit of art works representing another niche that has been inadequately recognized and appreciated: war art. With about 100 works provided principally by the famous and quixotic New York art dealer Guillaume Gallozzi, who had adopted an interest in war artists after having been among the first dealers to show graffiti, this show also featured British war artist Steven Sykes as a Gallozzi "find".

== Business with Russia ==
In 1991 Barbara met Finnish-American technology and marketing entrepreneur Ilkka "I.J." Ikävalko and went to work for his consulting firm which represented a large Finnish construction enterprise working in Russia with American companies, often large oil firms, as partners. The two married in the mid-1990s, and in 2003 moved to Houston. There, while continuing to work on the business side of technology projects, Barbara also represented Russian and American artists.

Barbara Rosen currently resides in the Shenandoah Valley of Virginia.
