= Carey Beebe =

Australian harpsichord maker and technician

Carey Beebe

Carey Beebe (born 1960, in Melbourne) is an Australian harpsichord maker and technician.

== Early training and work ==
After studies at the Sydney Conservatorium where his teachers included Gordon Watson and Robert Goode, Beebe graduated with a music degree as a harpsichord major and three performance diplomas including a Fellowship of Trinity College London. He then trained at the workshop of D. Jacques Way. Since 1999 Beebe has been working with the French harpsichord maker Marc Ducornet and The Paris Workshop.

== Sources ==
Atherton, M. (1990), Australian Made… Australian Played… — Handcrafted musical instruments from didjeridu to synthesiser, Sydney: NSWU Press

Macoboy, S. (1993), Macoboy's Roses, Melbourne: Mallon
