= Fernando Valenti =

American musician (1926–1990)

Fernando Valenti (New York, New York, 4 December 1926 – Red Bank, New Jersey, 6 September 1990) was an American harpsichordist. After studying with José Iturbi and Ralph Kirkpatrick and débuting in 1950, he recorded extensively, especially in the 1950s, and taught for forty years until his death. One of his most-noted students was Igor Kipnis. His recordings of Bach (two outstanding early ones for the Lyrichord Discs label) and Scarlatti (29 LPs with 346 sonatas for Westminster Records, recorded 1951–1961, another 8 sonatas for Music Guild in 1962, and a final set of 12 previously recorded sonatas for the Musical Heritage Society in 1964) were highly regarded, and he was regularly mentioned in the pages of National Review by William F. Buckley Jr. In one of the odder musical pairings of the 1960s, Valenti was on the same bill as Jimi Hendrix on Thanksgiving night, November 28, 1968, at New York's historic Philharmonic Hall.

In 1982 he published the well-received harpsichord method book The Harpsichord: a Dialogue for Beginners in a socratic style, saying "Many years ago I promised myself that I would never put in print anything that even vaguely resembled a 'method' for harpsichord, and this is it."
