= Eric Britton =

American economist

Francis Eric Knight Britton was an American political scientist and sustainability activist who lived and worked in Paris, France, since 1969. As the main convenor of The Commons: Open Society Sustainability Initiative and its various networks, he was well known for promoting integrated public transport, carsharing and bike sharing.

== Activities ==
=== Background ===
Britton was born in Boston, Massachusetts on 27 June 1938, and trained in the Physical Sciences and Economics at Amherst College, Columbia University (Graduate Faculties), the International Fellows Program, the University of Rome (La Sapienza), and École pratique des hautes études, Paris.

A former member of the Faculty of Economics at New York University and Mills College, and occasional lecturer at universities in many parts of the world; his work received early support from the Ford Foundation (“Why large transport projects fail and what we can learn from them: Case studies from Paris, London and Zurich”) and a Fulbright Fellowship for his work on “Development Theories and Myths in the Italian South (Mezzogiorno)”.

For many years, Britton was active in the creation and management of independent, interdisciplinary, cross-cultural peer networks and open partnerships for problem solving and providing counsel and policy direction for Governments, the private sector and volunteer and community groups in a broad range of problem areas involving technological change, sustainable development and social justice.

Britton died on October 31, 2021

=== Works ===
Through his own consultancy, EcoPlan International, Britton undertook projects which mainly relate to improving urban transport sustainability.

The Commons: Open Society Sustainability Initiative is an umbrella for related discussion groups and online resources relating to sustainable urban transport, The Commons and its related online journal World Streets aim to promote and disseminate best practice.

Much of his work involved co-ordinating the collaborative New Mobility Agenda, which encompassed a number of possible transport solutions, including car free days, carsharing, bikesharing and shared space projects.

== Previous projects ==
- 1975. Led open working group to prepare first strategy study for the French Ministry of the Environment what eventually became the French Carte Orange (an innovative monthly transport pass that exists to this date and which works to open up all public transport services in a city). As part of a broader innovations program entitled, «Points de pression pour la gestion de l’environnement urbaine» (Pressure points for Urban Environmental Management)
- 1988. High level international peer program in support of collaboration on the New Mobility Agenda which by 2006 brought together more than one thousand international colleagues and agencies working in the area of sustainable mobility and the politics of transportation
- 1994. In Toledo, Spain on 14 October publicly announced and then organized the International Car Free Days Network , an open society initiative which over the intervening years has led to several thousand events and city projects, the goal of which in each case is to create favorable conditions for sustainable transport reforms city by city. In 2000, organized the first Earth Car Free Day with the Earth Network, and in 2002 United Nations Car Free Days program with the Nations Division for Sustainable Development.
- 1997. Created the World Carshare Consortium to support carsharing innovation worldwide. Today serves more than five hundred individual experts, innovators, public agencies and carshare operators.
- 2004. Organized the annual Monaco Sustainable Cities/New Mobility Policy Dialogues – aimed at organizing “Accelerated Learning Sessions” for city managers, planners, decision-makers and activists concerned with improving the sustainability of transport in cities.
- 2006: Reinventing Transport in Cities: 2007-2012 program, a new collaborative project aiming to bring together thinking about transport in cities in the new century.
- 2009: Founded the online daily journal World Streets.

== Publications ==
Britton has authored, co-authored or contributed to more than two hundred reports, books and articles, co-founded and acted as editorial adviser to the Journal of "World Transport Policy and Practice", and served on editorial/advisory boards of “Traffic Engineering & Control”, and Mass Transit journals.

- “New Technology and Transportation: 1970-1995”, EuroFinance, Paris, 1969
- “Adelaide into the Eighties: Strategies and Directions for Project Policy in the Decade Ahead”, Director General of Transport, Adelaide, Australia, Sept. 1979
- “Paratransit in the Developing World: Neglected Options for Urban Mobility”, Organisation for Economic Co-operation and Development, Paris, July 1977 (in two volumes)
- “Energy, Growth and the Environment: A Three-Pronged Policy Strategy for Europe in the Decade Ahead”, with Hans-Holger Rogner of the International Institute for Applied Systems Analysis, Energy Directorate, European Commission, Brussels, 1993.
- “Thursday: Breakthrough strategies for reducing car dependence in cities”, La Ciudad Accessible, Toledo, Spain. Oct. 1994
- “TaxiCom: New Technology and Management Applications for Taxis”. Technology Sharing Program. Federal Transit Administration. DOT, Washington DC. Aug. 1995. (Update and extension of 1985 publication of same name)
- “The Information Society and Sustainable Development”. Editor and principal author. MCB University Press, Bradford, UK, March, 1996
- "Rethinking Work: New Ways to Work in an Information Society". Editor and principal author. Information Technology Directorate General, European Commission, Brussels, Nov. 1996,.
- “Carsharing 2000: A hammer for sustainable development”. The Journal of World Transport Policy and Practice, Lancaster, UK. Nov. 1999

== See also ==
- Carte Orange
- United Nations Car Free Days
- Vélib
