= List of works by Harry Partch =

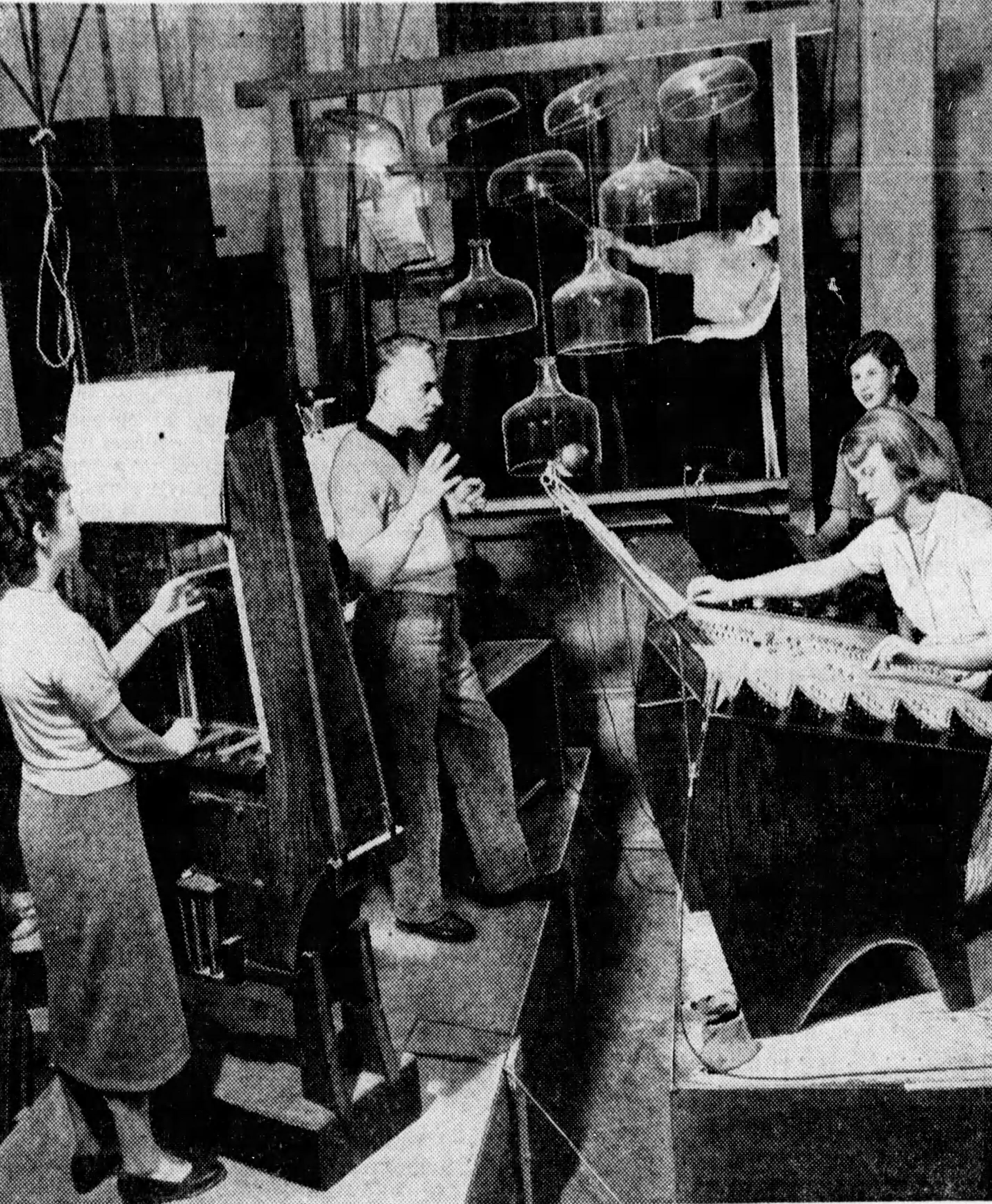
Partch (center) directing four college students in rehearsal

The American composer Harry Partch (1901–1974) composed in musical tunings not available on conventional Western instruments. Instead, he developed a 43-tone scale and new instruments. His music emphasized monophony and corporeality, in contrast to the abstract, polyphonic music prevalent at the time. His earliest compositions were small-scale pieces to be intoned to instrumental backing; his later works were large-scale, integrated theater productions in which he expected each of the performers to sing, dance, speak, and play instruments.

Partch described the theory and practice of his music in his book Genesis of a Music, which he had published first in 1947, and in an expanded edition in 1974. A collection of essays, journals, and librettos by Partch was published posthumously as Bitter Music: Collected Journals, Essays, Introductions, and Librettos 1991. Philip Blackburn edited a collection of Partch's writings, drawings, scores, and photographs, published as Enclosure 3 in 1997.

Partch partially supported himself with the sales of recordings, which he began making in the late 1930s. He published his recordings under the Gate 5 Records label beginning in 1953. Towards the end of his life, Columbia Masterworks released records of his works. Partch scored six films by Madeline Tourtelot, starting with 1957's Windsong, and was the subject of a number of documentaries.

== Works ==
- Seventeen Lyrics by Li Po (1930–1933)
- Two Psalms (1931)
- The Potion Scene (from Shakespeare's Romeo and Juliet) (1931/1955)
- The Wayward
  - Barstow: Eight Hitchhikers' Inscriptions (1941/1954/1967)
  - San Francisco: A Setting of the Cries of Two Newsboys on a Street Corner (1943)
  - The Letter (1943)
  - U.S. Highball (1943/1955)
- Yankee Doodle Fantasy (1944)
- Dark Brother (1942–1943)
- Two Settings from Joyce's Finnegans Wake (1944)
- "I'm very happy to be telling you about this..." (1945)
- Two Studies on Ancient Greek Scales (1946)
- Eleven Intrusions (1949–1950)
- Plectra and Percussion Dances
  - Ring Around the Moon (1949–1950)
  - Castor and Pollux (1952)
  - Even Wild Horses (1952)
- Oedipus (1950/1952–1954/1967)
- Two Settings from Lewis Carroll (1954)
- Ulysses at the Edge (1955)
- The Bewitched (1955/1973)
- Windsong (1955)
  - rewritten as Daphne of the Dunes (1967)
- Revelation in the Courthouse Park (1960)
- Rotate the Body in All Its Planes (1961)
- Bless This Home (1961)
- Water! Water!: An Intermission with Prologues and Epilogues (1961)
- And on the Seventh Day Petals Fell in Petaluma (1963–66)
- Delusion of the Fury (1965–66)
- The Dreamer That Remains—A Study in Loving (1972)

== Books ==
- Genesis of a Music (1947; revised 1974) Da Capo Press. ISBN 978-0306801068
- Bitter Music: Collected Journals, Essays, Introductions, and Librettos (1991; published posthumously) University of Illinois Press. ISBN 978-0252069130
- Enclosure 3 (1997) Innova. ISBN 0-9656569-0-X

== Recordings ==
=== Audio ===
Partch made recordings of his own music; on recordings such as the soundtrack to Windsong, he used multitrack recording, which allowed him to play all the instruments himself. He never used synthesized or computer-generated sounds, though he had access to such technology.

- The World of Harry Partch (Columbia Masterworks MS 7207 & MQ 7207, 1969, out of print) Daphne of the Dunes, Barstow, and Castor & Pollux, conducted by Danlee Mitchell under the supervision of the composer.
- Delusion of the Fury (Columbia Masterworks LP M2 30576, 1971; CD Innova Recordings 406, 2001) Delusion of the Fury, conducted by Danlee Mitchell under the supervision of the composer and "EXTRA: A Glimpse into the World of Harry Partch", composer introduces and comments on the 27 unique instruments built by him.
- Enclosure II (early speech-music works) (Innova 401)
- Enclosure V ("On a Greek Theme") (Innova 405)
- Enclosure VI ("Delusion of the Fury") (Innova 406)
- Harry Partch: Delusion of the Fury. A Ritual of Dream and Delusion (Wergo, 2022) Delusion of the Fury, conducted by Heiner Goebbels.

=== Films ===
Films scored by Harry Partch
Title	Year	Length	Director	Notes
Windsong	1958	17:38	Madeline Tourtelot	
Music Studio—Harry Partch	1958	17:48	Madeline Tourtelot	
Rotate the Body in All Its Planes	1961	9:00	Madeline Tourtelot	
Revelation in the Courthouse Park	1961	6:50	Madeline Tourtelot	Excerpts of University of Illinois production filmed April 19, 1961, for WILL-TV (broadcast April 25 and May 3); Producer (stage): Barnard Hewitt; Conductor: John Garvey
The Music of Harry Partch	1968	29:59	Paul Marshall; Paul Steen	KEBS-TV documentary.; Features a performance of Daphne of the Dunes conducted by Thomas Nee.
U.S. Highball	1968	24:18	Madeline Tourtelot	Originally filmed in 1958
Delusion of the Fury: A Ritual of Dream and Delusion	1971	75:00	Madeline Tourtelot	Filmed at UCLA in 1969.; Choreography: Storie Crawford; Stage director: John Crawford
The Dreamer That Remains: A Portrait of Harry Partch	1973	27:00	Stephen Pouliot	Producer: Betty Freeman; A Tantalus Film in Association with Whitelight
