= Ptolemy (name) =

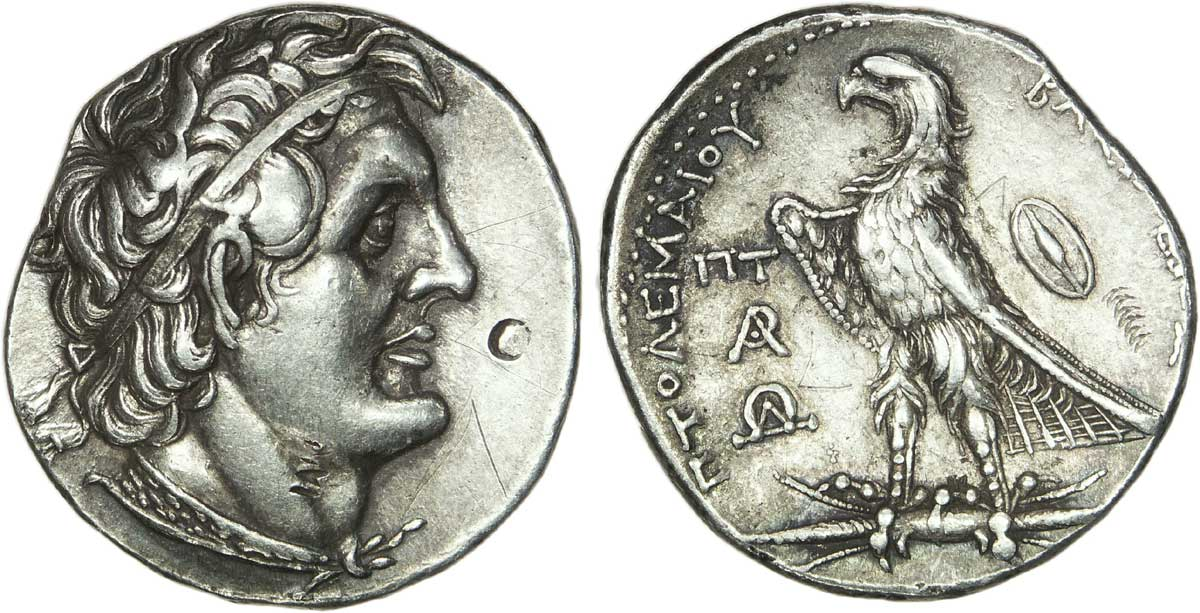
Tetradrachm of Ptolemy II Philadelphus with the Eagle of Zeus. Greek inscription reads ΠΤΟΛΕΜΑΙΟΥ lit. '[coin] of Ptolemy'

Ptolemy (Ancient Greek: Πτολεμαῖος, Ptolemaios) is a male given name, derived from Ancient Greek and meaning 'warlike'. It is formed from the Epic Greek πτόλεμος ptolemos meaning 'war'. The name was used throughout the Greek world, but was particularly popular in ancient Macedon and its nobility. The earliest recorded use of the name is in the Iliad of Homer. During the Hellenistic period, Ptolemy I Soter, a general of Alexander the Great, founded the Ptolemaic dynasty which ruled their Kingdom in Ancient Egypt. All male rulers of the dynasty bore the name 'Ptolemy', the last being Ptolemy XII Auletes, father of Cleopatra. Common variants include Ptolemaeus (Latin), Tolomeo (Italian) and Talmai (Hebrew).

== Etymology ==
Ptolemy is the English form of the Ancient Greek name Πτολεμαῖος (Ptolemaios), a derivative of πτόλεμος, an Epic form of πόλεμος 'war' (Note: The change from polemos to ptolemos is an example of a type of linguistic compounding called terpsimbrotos. The pt- in ptolemos (vs. earlier polemos) "war" is thought to arise from a re-analysis of the compound word *phere-t-polemos, metathesised to phere-ptolemos. George Dunkel, "Two old problems in Greek: πτόλεμος and τερψίμβροτος", Glotta 70:3/4:197-225 (1992) JSTOR 40266932.) and the suffix -αῖος -aios meaning 'pertaining' or 'belonging to'. A nephew of Antigonus I Monophthalmus was called Polemaeus, the normal form of the adjective. Ptolemaios is first attested in Homer's Iliad and is the name of an Achaean warrior, son of Piraeus, father of Eurymedon.

The name Ptolemaios varied over the years from its roots in ancient Greece, appearing in different languages in various forms and spellings:

Ancient Greek: Πτολεμαῖος Ptolemaîos

- Latin: Ptolemaeus
- German: Ptolemäus, Ptolemaios
- Italian: Tolomeo
- English: Ptolemy
- Ancient Egyptian: ptwꜣrwmysp t wA l M i i s
- Coptic: ⲡⲧⲟⲗⲉⲙⲁⲓⲟⲥ Ptolemaios
- Phoenician: 𐤐𐤕𐤋𐤌𐤉𐤎 (ptlmys) or 𐤐𐤕𐤋𐤌𐤉𐤔 (ptlmyš)
- Hebrew and Aramaic: תלמי (tlmy) Talmay
- Middle Persian 𐭯𐭲𐭫𐭬𐭥𐭱 (ptlmywš) Patlamyōš
- Persian: بَطلَمیوس، پتُلِمَیوس Baṭlamīūs/ Ptolemaios
- Arabic: بَطُلِيمُوس Baṭulīmūs

The name Ptolemy spread from its Greek origins to enter other languages in Western Asia during the Hellenisation that followed the conquest of the known world by Alexander the Great.

The Aramaic name Bar-Talmai 'son of Talmai' (Greek Bartolomaios, English Bartholomew) may be related (Bartholomew the Apostle is thus thought to have been the son of a Ptolemy.)³

Ptolemais is formed from this name by the Greek feminine adjectival ending -i(d)s.

== Claudius Ptolemaeus ==
Ptolemy commonly refers to Claudius Ptolemaeus (ca. 90 AD–ca. 168 AD), a writer, geographer, mathematician, astronomer and astrologer who lived in the Alexandrine Greek culture of Roman Egypt.

== Ptolemaic dynasty ==
< p t wA l M i i s >
Ptolemy
in hieroglyphs
Era: Ptolemaic dynasty
(305–30 BC)

Ptolemy was the name of several pharaohs of the Ptolemaic dynasty who ruled Hellenistic Egypt for nearly 300 years, from 305 BC to 30 BC. The Greco-Egyptian pharaonic dynasty of Macedonian origin was established by Ptolemy I Soter (303–282 BC), and the male dynastic successors were all also named Ptolemy. Dynasty members who ruled Egypt include:

- Ptolemy I Soter
- Ptolemy II Philadelphus
- Ptolemy III Euergetes
- Ptolemy IV Philopator
- Ptolemy V Epiphanes
- Ptolemy VI Philometor
- Ptolemy VII Neos Philopator
- Ptolemy VIII Physcon
- Ptolemy IX Lathyros
- Ptolemy X Alexander I
- Ptolemy XI Alexander II
- Ptolemy XII Auletes
- Ptolemy XIII Theos Philopator
- Ptolemy XIV Philopator
- Ptolemy XV Caesarion

Several dynasty members ruled other territories not in Egypt:

- Ptolemy Apion, King of Cyrene (150–145 BC)
- Ptolemy Philadelphus (son of Cleopatra) (36 BC – 29 BC), King of Syria, Phoenicia, and Cilicia (34-30 BC)
- Ptolemy of Mauretania, client king of Mauretania (20–40 AD) for Rome

== Other people named Ptolemy or Ptolemaeus ==
=== In antiquity ===
- Ptolemy of Thebes (12th century BC), mythical ruler of the ancient Greek city of Thebes
- Ptolemy of Aloros (ruled 368 to 365 BC), Regent of Macedon
- Ptolemy (somatophylax) (died 334 BC), Macedonian bodyguard and general of Alexander the Great
- Ptolemy (son of Seleucus) (died 333 BC), Macedonian bodyguard and general of Alexander the Great
- Ptolemy (son of Philip) (4th century BC), Macedonian officer of Alexander the Great
- Ptolemy (nephew of Antigonus I Monophthalmus) (died 309 BC), Macedonian general
- Ptolemy (son of Pyrrhus) (295–272 BC), a son of king Pyrrhus of Epirus
- Ptolemy of Epirus, King of the Greek frontier kingdom of Epirus c. 237 BC – 234 ВС
- Ptolemy Macron (fl. 2nd century BC), governor of Coele-Syria and Phoenicia.
- Ptolemy Pindarion (2nd century BC), grammarian
- Ptolemaeus of Commagene (201 - 130 BC), satrap and then first King of Commagene
- Ptolemaios son of Glaukias (c. 200 – after 152 BC), hermit (katochos) in the Sarapeum at Memphis, Egypt
- Ptolemy son of Abubus, governor of Jericho (ca. 130 BC) in the First Book of the Maccabees; instigated the death of Simon Maccabees; and for whom Dante named the section of Hell reserved for traitors to guests ('Ptolemaea')
- Ptolemy (son of Mennaeus) (rule ended ca. 40 BC), governor of biblical Abilene, a district of the disputed region of Coele-Syria
- Ptolemy of Mauretania (d.40 AD)
- Ptolemaeus Chennus (2nd century AD), a grammarian who lived in the Alexandrine Greek culture of Roman Egypt
- Ptolemaeus and Lucius (d. c. 165 AD), Christian martyrs
- Ptolemy (Gnostic) (c. 180 AD), a religious philosopher who was active in Roman Italy and Gaul
- Ptolemy-el-Garib (fl. c. 300 AD), a Peripatetic pinacographer whose Life of Aristotle

=== In medieval and modern times ===
- Ptolemy I of Tusculum (d.1126), a count of Tusculum who asserted his family's descent from the Roman Julii
- Ptolemy II of Tusculum (d.1153), a count of Tusculum who married Bertha, daughter of Henry V, Holy Roman Emperor
- Ptolemaios Sarigiannis (1882–1958), a Greek Army officer
- Ptolemy Tompkins (born 1962), American author
- Ptolemy Dean (born 1968), British architect, author, and TV presenter
- Ptolemy Slocum (born 1975), American actor
- Barry Ptolemy (born 1969), American film director and producer

== People named Tolomeo or Tolomei ==
- Tolomeo da Lucca or Bartholomew of Lucca (Bartolomeo Fiadoni c. 1236 – c. 1327), a medieval Italian historian
- Bernardo Tolomei (1272–1348), founder of the Olivetan Roman
- Tolomeo Gallio (1527–1607), an Italian cardinal
- Tolomeo Faccendi (1905–1970), an Italian sculptor
- Tolomeo Mwansa (1941-2014), a Zambian football goalkeeper
- Giovanni Battista Tolomei (1653–1726), Italian Jesuit priest, theologian, and cardinal

== Uses in arts and entertainment ==
- The Ptolemy (1934) is a large reed organ built by Harry Partch, the American composer, named in tribute to Claudius Ptolemaeus
- Tolomeo is an opera by Handel composed in 1728, a fictionalisation of some events in the life of Ptolemy IX Lathyros, king of Egypt
- Alderman Ptolemy Tortoise is a character in The Tale of Mr. Jeremy Fisher by Beatrix Potter
- Ptolemaios and Ptolemaios 2 are fictional spacecraft in the anime television series Mobile Suit Gundam 00 and film Mobile Suit Gundam 00 the Movie: A Wakening of the Trailblazer
- Ptolemy's Gate, published 2005, is the third book in The Bartimaeus Trilogy, a fantasy series by the English author Jonathan Stroud. The series includes a character called Ptolemy, from 2nd century BC Ptolemaic Egypt, who is nephew to Ptolemy VIII and cousin to Ptolemy IX
- Ptolemaic Terrascope is a magazine founded in 1989. The name was inspired by "Ptolemy the turtle, who lives at Terrascope Towers". Various artworks and logos feature an astronomer peering through a 'terrascope', so Ptolemaic may here refer to Claudius Ptolemaeus
- The Last Days of Ptolemy Grey is a novel by Walter Mosley, later adapted into a miniseries of the same name, whose titular character is a lonely 93-year-old man with dementia.
- Ptolemy, a track by Aphex Twin from the 1992 album Selected Ambient Works 85–92
- Ptolemaea, a song by Ethel Cain from her debut album Preacher's Daughter

== See also ==
- Ptolemy (disambiguation)
- Ptolemaeus (disambiguation)
- Tolomeo (disambiguation)
