= Exordium =

Exordium may refer to:

- Exordium (rhetoric), the introductory section of a discourse in Western classical rhetoric
- Exordium clause, the first paragraph or sentence in a (last) will and testament
- Exordium, a science fiction book series written by Sherwood Smith and Dave Trowbridge
- Exordium (EP), by Dutch symphonic metal band After Forever
- "Exordium", a track by Amall Mallick from the 2021 Indian film Saina
- "Exordium: The Beginning Of a Web", opening section of Delusion of the Fury by Harry Partch
