= Ptolemais =

Ptolemais may refer to:

== People ==
- Ptolemais of Cyrene, a c. 3rd-century BC mathematician and musical theorist
- Ptolemais, daughter of Ptolemy I Soter and mother of Demetrius the Fair
- Ptolemais (tribe), a phyle of Ancient Athens

== Places ==
=== Africa ===
- Ptolemais, Cyrenaica, a city in modern-day Libya
- Ptolemais Euergetis, in what is now the Faiyum in Egypt
- Ptolemais Hermiou or Ptolemais in the Thebaid, modern-day El Mansha in the Sohag Governorate of Egypt
- Ptolemais Theron, a city on the African coast of the Red Sea

=== Elsewhere ===
- Ptolemais or Lebedus, on and around the Kısık Peninsula
- Ptolemaida in West Macedonia, Greece
- Ptolemais (Pamphylia), a coastal town of ancient Pamphylia or of Cilicia
- Ptolemais, a name that may have been given to Larisa (Troad), Anatolia
- Ptolemais (bishopric), a titular see centred on Acre, in modern-day Israel

== See also ==
- Ptolemy (disambiguation)
- Ptolemaic Kingdom
- Ptolemaiida, a taxon of extinct wolf-like mammals
