= Ptolemaea =

Ptolemaea may refer to:

- Ptolemaea, a section of hell in Dante's Inferno
- "Ptolemaea", a song by Ethel Cain from the 2022 album Preacher's Daughter

== See also ==
- Ptolemy (disambiguation)
