= Ptolemy (disambiguation) =

Ptolemy (c. AD 100 – c. 170) was an Alexandrian mathematician, astronomer, geographer and astrologer.

Ptolemy, Ptolemaeus or Tolomeo may also refer to:

== People ==
- Ptolemy (name), including a list of people and fictional entities with the mononym and given name
  - Including: Ptolemy of Thebes, Ptolemy Epigonos, Ptolemy II of Telmessos, Ptolemy Ceraunus, Ptolemy of Epirus, Ptolemy (son of Seleucus), Ptolemy Apion, Ptolemy of Cyprus, Ptolemaeus of Commagene, Ptolemy of Mauretania, Ptolemy Philadelphus (son of Cleopatra), Ptolemy of Ascalon
- Ptolemaic dynasty, ruling dynasty of the Ptolemaic kingdom
  - Ptolemy I Soter, general of Alexander the Great and founder of the Ptolemaic dynasty
  - Ptolemy II Philadelphus, Ptolemy III Euergetes, Ptolemy IV Philopator, Ptolemy V Epiphanes, Ptolemy VI Philometor, Ptolemy VII Neos Philopator, Ptolemy VIII Physcon (Euergetes II Tryphon), Ptolemy IX Soter II (Lathyros), Ptolemy X Alexander I, Ptolemy XI Alexander II, Ptolemy XII Auletes (Neos Dionysus), Ptolemy XIII Theos Philopator, Ptolemy XIV Philopator, Ptolemy XV Caesar (Caesarion)

== Places ==
- Ptolemaic Kingdom
- Mount Ptolemy (Antarctica)
- Mount Ptolemy (Canada)
- Lake Ptolemy
- Ptolemy's world map
- Messier 7 also known as Ptolemy's Cluster
- Ptolemaeus (lunar crater)
- Ptolemaeus (Martian crater)
- 4001 Ptolemaeus, an asteroid

== Music ==
- Ptolemy's intense diatonic scale
- Tolomeo ('Ptolemy'), a 1728 opera by Handel
- "Ptolemy", a track from the 1992 album Selected Ambient Works 85–92 by Aphex Twin
- The Ptolemy, a 1934 large reed organ built by Harry Partch

== See also ==
- Ptolemaea (disambiguation)
- Tolomeo (disambiguation)
