= Harry Partch's 43-tone scale =

Musical scale created by Harry Partch

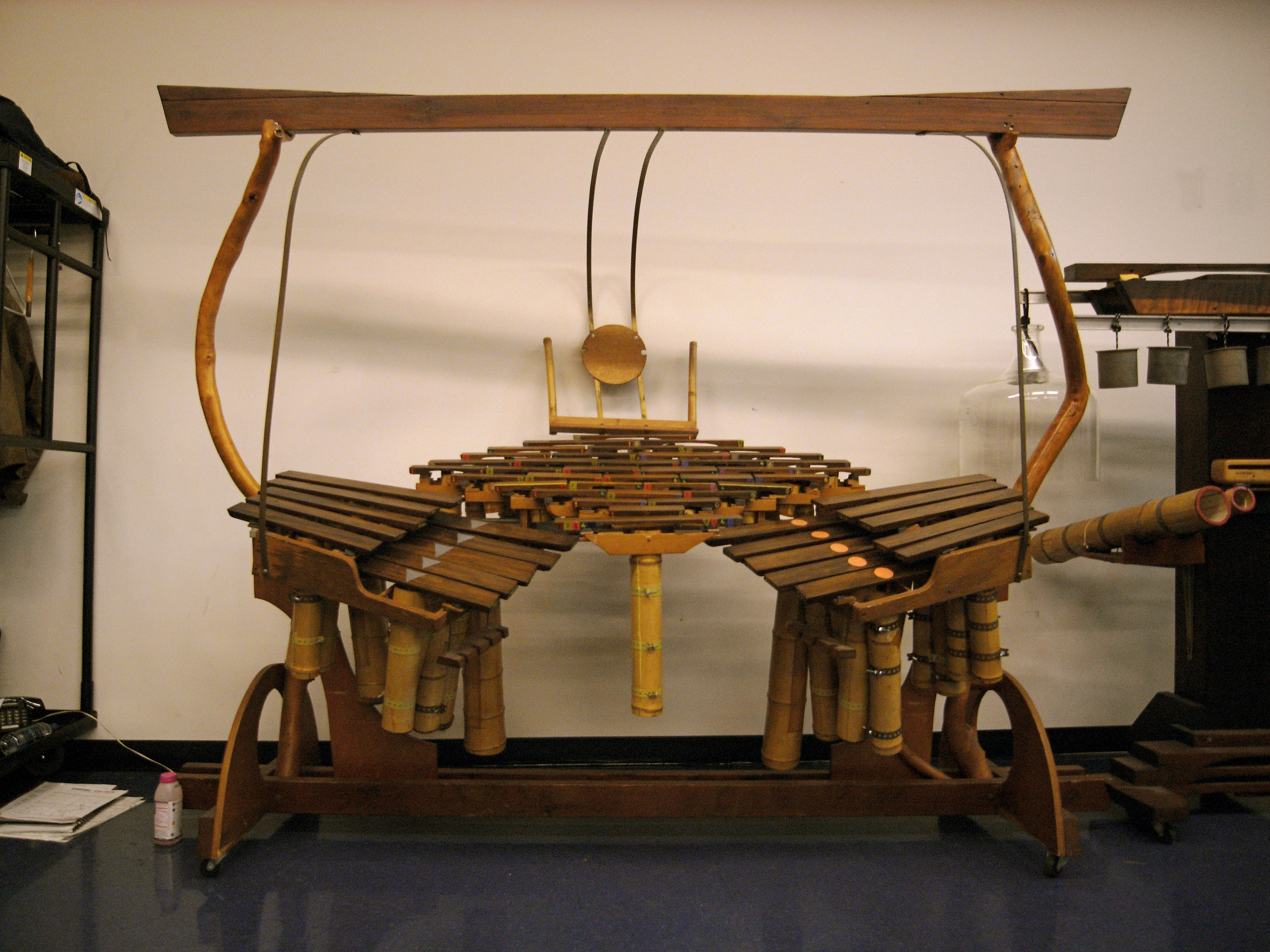
Quadrangularis Reversum, one of Partch's instruments featuring the 43-tone scale

The 43-tone scale is a just intonation scale with 43 pitches in each octave. It is based on an eleven-limit tonality diamond, similar to the seven-limit diamond previously devised by Max Friedrich Meyer and refined by Harry Partch.

The first of Partch's "four concepts" is "The scale of musical intervals begins with absolute consonance (1 to 1) and gradually progresses into an infinitude of dissonance, the consonance of the intervals decreasing as the odd numbers of their ratios increase." Almost all of Partch's music is written in the 43-tone scale, and although most of his instruments can play only subsets of the full scale, he used it as an all-encompassing framework.

== Construction ==
Partch chose the 11 limit (i.e. all rational numbers with odd factors of numerator and denominator not exceeding 11) as the basis of his music, because the 11th harmonic is the first that is utterly foreign to Western ears. The seventh harmonic is poorly approximated by 12-tone equal temperament, but it appears in ancient Greek scales, is well-approximated by meantone temperament, and it is familiar from the barbershop quartet; the ninth harmonic is comparatively well approximated by equal temperament and it exists in Pythagorean tuning (because 3 × 3 = 9); but the 11th harmonic falls right in the middle between two pitches of 12-tone equal temperament (551.3 cents). Although theorists like Hindemith and Schoenberg have suggested that the 11th harmonic is implied by, e.g. F♯ in the key of C, Partch's opinion is that it is simply too far out of tune, and "if the ear does not realize an implication, it does not exist."

=== Ratios of the 11 limit ===
Here are all the ratios within the octave with odd factors up to and including 11, known as the 11-limit tonality diamond. Note that the inversion of every interval is also present, so the set is symmetric about the octave.

Cents	0	150.6	165.0	182.4	203.9	231.2	266.9	315.6	347.4	386.3	417.5	435.1	498.0	551.3	582.5
Ratio	1/1	12/11	11/10	10/9	9/8	8/7	7/6	6/5	11/9	5/4	14/11	9/7	4/3	11/8	7/5
41-ET	0.0	5.1	5.6	6.2	7.0	7.9	9.1	10.8	11.9	13.2	14.3	14.9	17.0	18.8	19.9
Audio															

Cents	617.5	648.7	702.0	764.9	782.5	813.7	852.6	884.4	933.1	968.8	996.1	1017.6	1035.0	1049.4	1200
Ratio	10/7	16/11	3/2	14/9	11/7	8/5	18/11	5/3	12/7	7/4	16/9	9/5	20/11	11/6	2/1
41-ET	21.1	22.2	24.0	26.1	26.7	27.8	29.1	30.2	31.9	33.1	34.0	34.8	35.4	35.9	41.0
Audio															

=== Filling in the gaps ===
There are two reasons why the 11-limit ratios by themselves would not make a good scale. First, the scale only contains a complete set of chords (otonalities and utonalities) based on one tonic pitch. Second, it contains large gaps, between the tonic and the two pitches to either side, as well as several other places. Both problems can be solved by filling in the gaps with "multiple-number ratios", or intervals obtained from the product or quotient of other intervals within the 11 limit.

Cents	0	21.5	53.2	84.5	111.7	150.6
Ratio	1/1	81/80	33/32	21/20	16/15	12/11

Cents	266.9	294.1	315.6
Ratio	7/6	32/27	6/5

Cents	435.1	470.8	498.0	519.5	551.3
Ratio	9/7	21/16	4/3	27/20	11/8

Cents	648.7	680.5	702.0	729.2	764.9
Ratio	16/11	40/27	3/2	32/21	14/9

Cents	884.4	905.9	933.1
Ratio	5/3	27/16	12/7

Cents	1049.4	1088.3	1115.5	1146.8	1178.5	1200
Ratio	11/6	15/8	40/21	64/33	160/81	2/1

Together with the 29 ratios of the 11 limit, these 14 multiple-number ratios make up the full 43-tone scale.

Erv Wilson who worked with Partch has pointed out that these added tones form a constant structure of 41 tones with two variables. A constant structure giving one the property of anytime a ratio appears it will be subtended by the same number of steps. In this way Partch resolved his harmonic and melodic symmetry in one of the best ways possible.

== Other Partch scales ==
The 43-tone scale was published in Genesis of a Music, and is sometimes known as the Genesis scale, or Partch's pure scale. Other scales he used or considered include a 29 tone scale for adapted viola from 1928; 29, 37, and 55 tone scales from an unpublished manuscript titled "Exposition of Monophony" from 1928; 33, a 39 tone scale proposed for a keyboard, and a 41 tone scale and an alternative 43 tone scale from "Exposition of Monophony".

Besides the 11 limit diamond, he also published 5 and 13 limit diamonds, and in an unpublished manuscript worked out a 17 limit diamond.

Erv Wilson who did the original drawings in Partch's Genesis of a Music has made a series of diagrams of Partch's diamond as well as others like Diamonds.
