= Tolomeo (disambiguation) =

Tolomeo (Italian, 'Ptolemy') is an opera seria by Handel.

Tolomeo may also refer to:

- Ptolemy (name), including a list of people named Tolomeo
- Tolomeo (horse) (1980 – circa 2000), a Thoroughbred racehorse
- Tolomeo desk lamp, an iconic Italian desk lamp design

== See also ==
- Ptolemy (disambiguation)
- Tolomeo e Alessandro, an opera by Scarlatti
