= Instruments by Harry Partch =

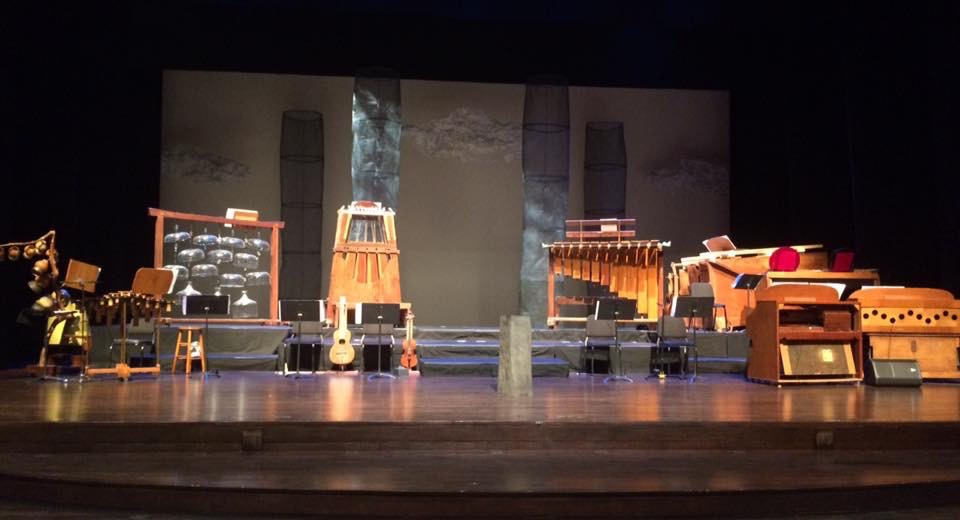
Harry Partch's original instruments on stage

The American composer Harry Partch (1901–1974) composed using scales of unequal intervals in just intonation, derived from the natural Harmonic series; these scales allowed for more tones of smaller intervals than in the standard Western tuning, which uses twelve equal intervals. The tonal system Partch used has 43 tones to the octave. To play this music he invented and built many new instruments, with names such as the Chromelodeon, the Quadrangularis Reversum, and the Zymo-Xyl.

Partch called himself "a philosophic music-man seduced into carpentry". The path towards Partch's use of many unique instruments was a gradual one. Partch began in the 1920s using traditional instruments, and wrote a string quartet in just intonation (now lost). He had his first specialized instrument built for him in 1930—the Adapted Viola, a viola with a cello's neck fitted on it.

He re-tuned the reeds of several reed organs and labeled the keys with a color code. The first was called the Ptolemy, in tribute to the ancient music theorist Claudius Ptolemaeus, whose musical scales included ratios of the 11-limit, as Partch's did. The others were called Chromelodeons, a portmanteau of chrome (meaning "color") and melodeon.

Most of Partch's works used the instruments he created exclusively. Some works made use of unaltered standard instruments such as oboe, clarinet, or cello, and Revelation in the Courtyard Park (1960) used an unaltered small wind band.

In 1991, Dean Drummond became the custodian of the original Harry Partch instrument collection until his death in 2013. In 1999 the instruments began a residency at Montclair State University in Montclair, New Jersey which lasted until November 2014 when they moved to the University of Washington in Seattle, where they remained until 2019. They are currently under the care of Charles Corey.

Those who have duplicated partial sets of Partch instruments include John Schneider, whose West Coast ensemble includes replicas of the Kithara, Surrogate Kithara, Cloud-Chamber Bowls, Adapted Guitars, Adapted Viola, Diamond Marimba, Bass Marimba, Chromelodeon, and two Harmonic Canons.

A complete set of replica instruments was commissioned by Ensemble Musikfabrik in 2012 and built by German percussionist Thomas Meixner. They were used in performances of Partch's works including his large-scale theater piece, Delusion of the Fury including at The Ruhrtriennale: International Festival of the Arts.

== Adapted Guitars ==
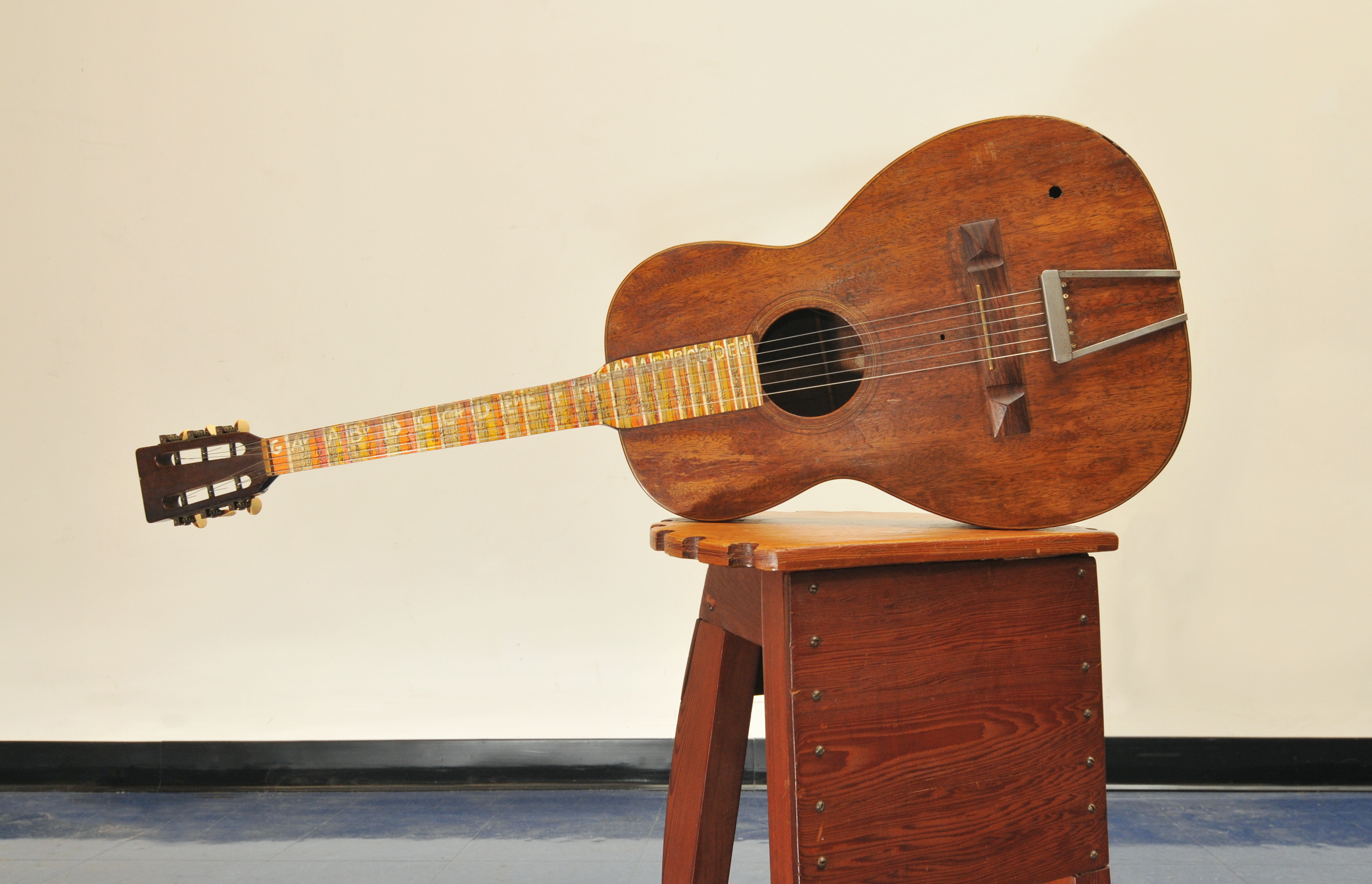
Adapted Guitar I

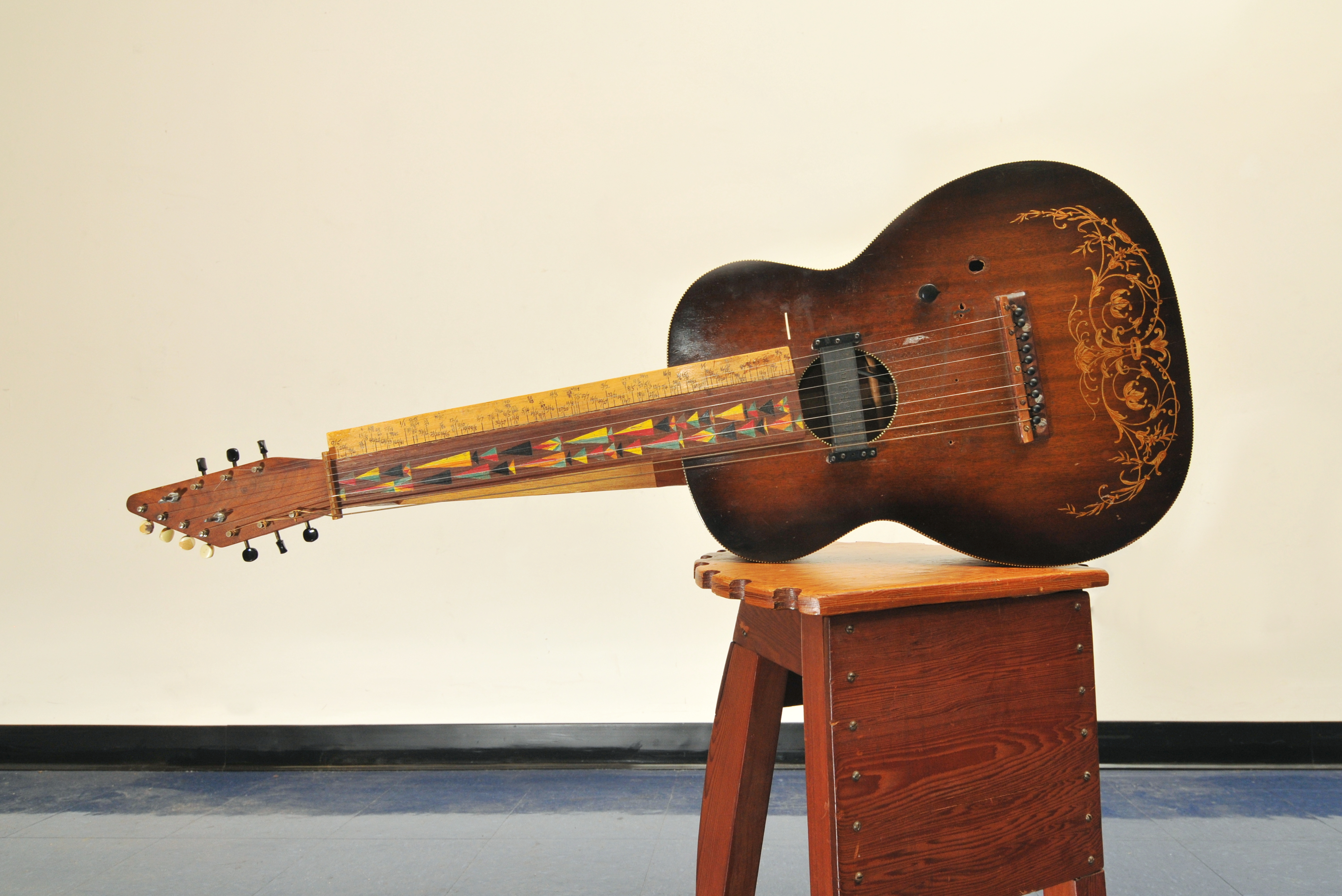
Adapted Guitar II

Partch built two steel-string guitars: the six-string Adapted Guitar I, and the ten-string Adapted Guitar II (played with a slide). Partch first started experimenting with such instruments in 1934, and the Adapted Guitar I first appeared in Barstow in 1941. In 1945, he began using amplification for both instruments.

== Adapted Viola ==
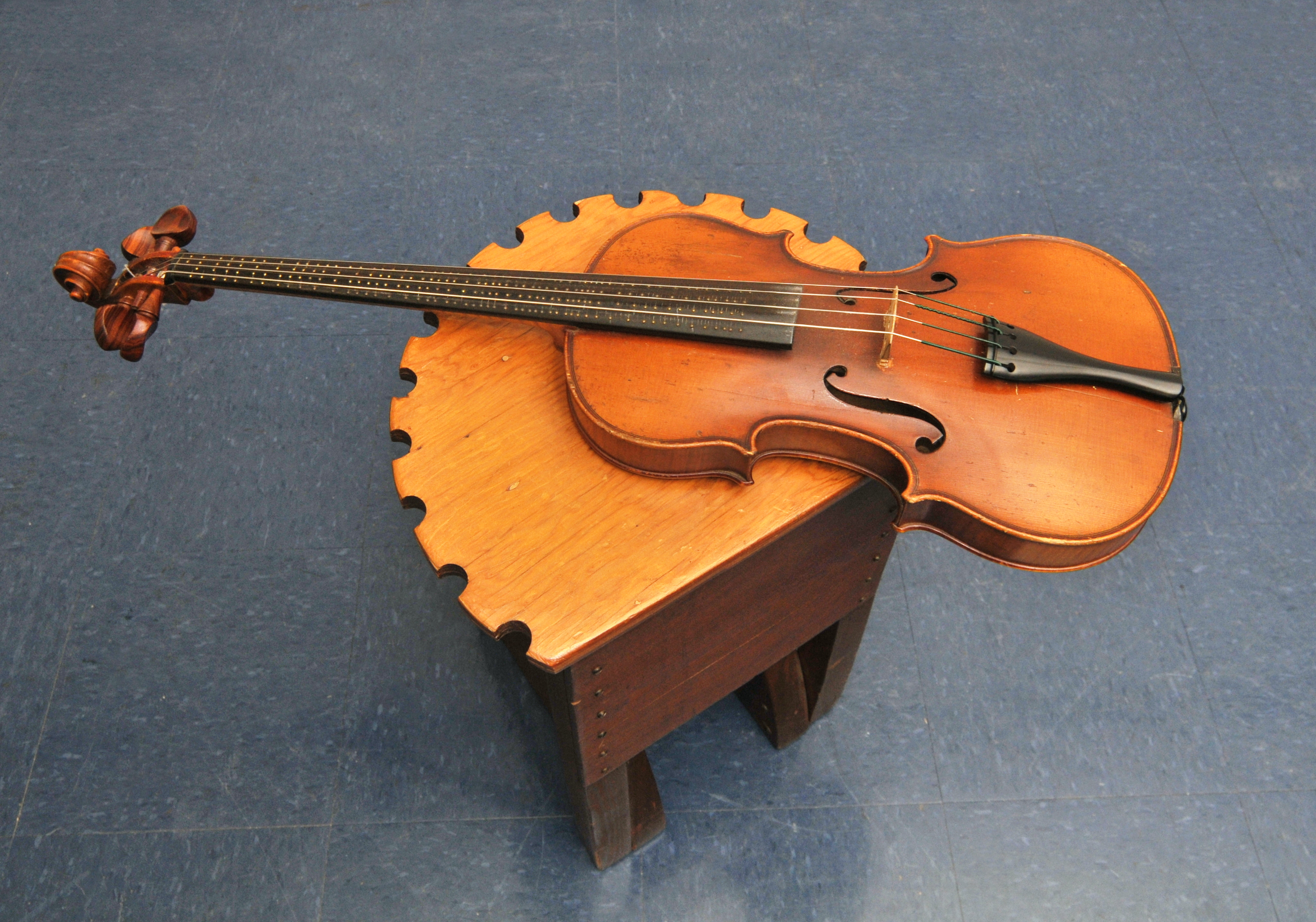
Adapted Viola

Tuning of the four strings of Harry Partch's Adapted Viola. It also shows the ratios in which each string is tuned (G=1/1).

The Adapted Viola is the earliest extant instrument created by Partch. It is made from a cello fingerboard neck attached to the body of a viola. It also includes a changeable bridge which allows triple stops, i.e. full triads, to be sustained. Partch hammered brads into the fingerboard to aid with finding fingerings. The Adapted Viola was constructed in New Orleans with the assistance of Edward Benton, a local violin maker. Partch originally called it the Monophone, but by 1933 it had become known as the Adapted Viola.

Partch tuned the Adapted Viola an octave below the violin and the brads inserted into the instrument fingerboard are placed at ratios commonly used in Partch's works. In playing the instrument, Partch called for a "one-finger technique," which is "much closer to the spirit of Indian vina playing than it is to the pipe organ." Specifically, he desired that notes should be approached by gliding from tone to tone:

The finger may start slowly on its move, increase speed, and hit the next ratio exactly. It may move very fast from the first ratio, and then move slowly and insinuatingly into the next—so slowly, sometimes, that one is not sure as to the point where rest has been achieved. Or, all this may be reversed. What the bow is doing meanwhile, in its capacity of providing an infinitude of nuance, is supremely important.

— Harry Partch, Genesis of a Music, page 202

As Partch's first instrument, the Adapted Viola is used heavily in many of his early mature compositions. In works such as Seventeen Lyrics by Li Po and Two Psalms the music is scored only for Adapted Viola and intoning voice.

== Bamboo Marimbas ==
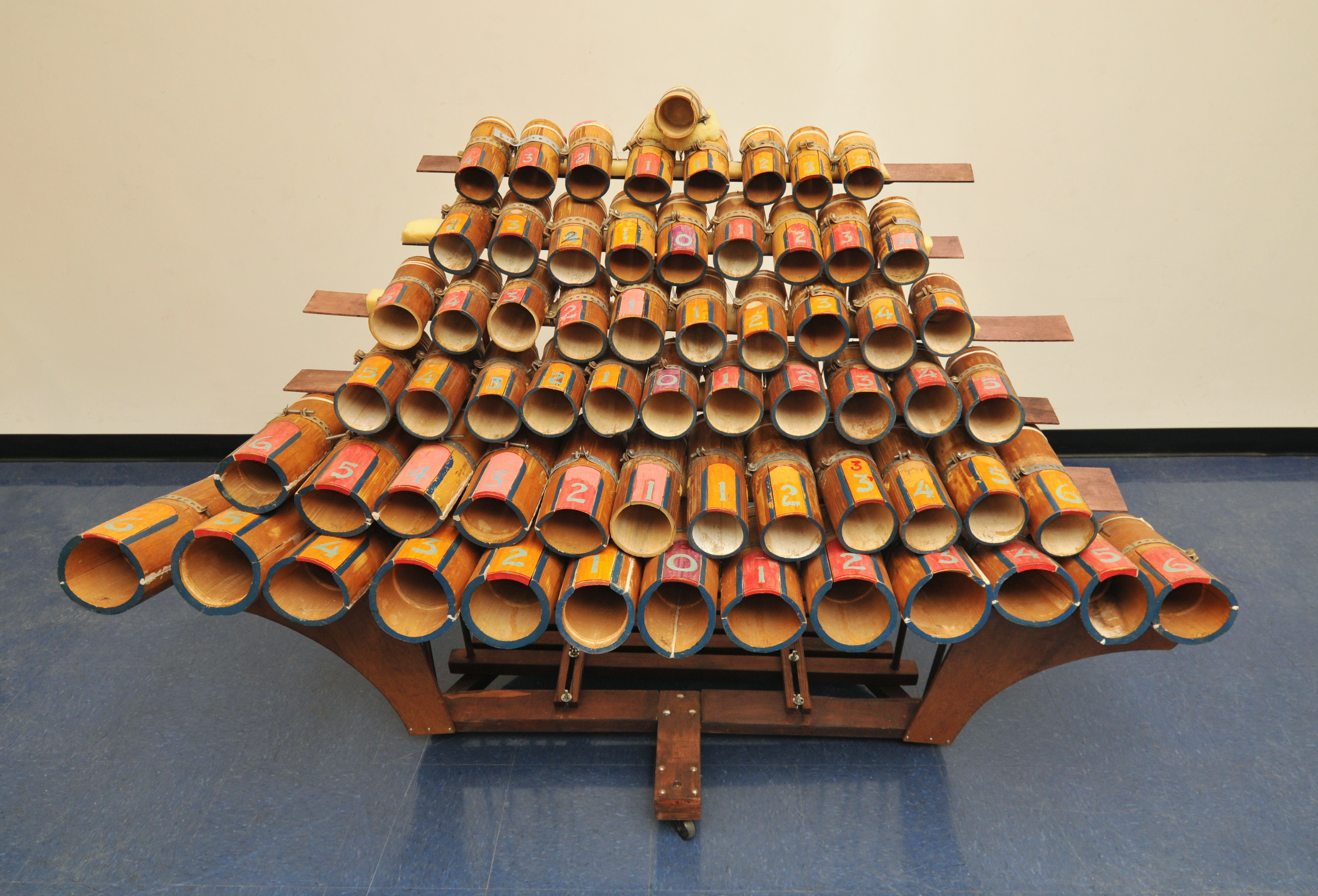
Boo I

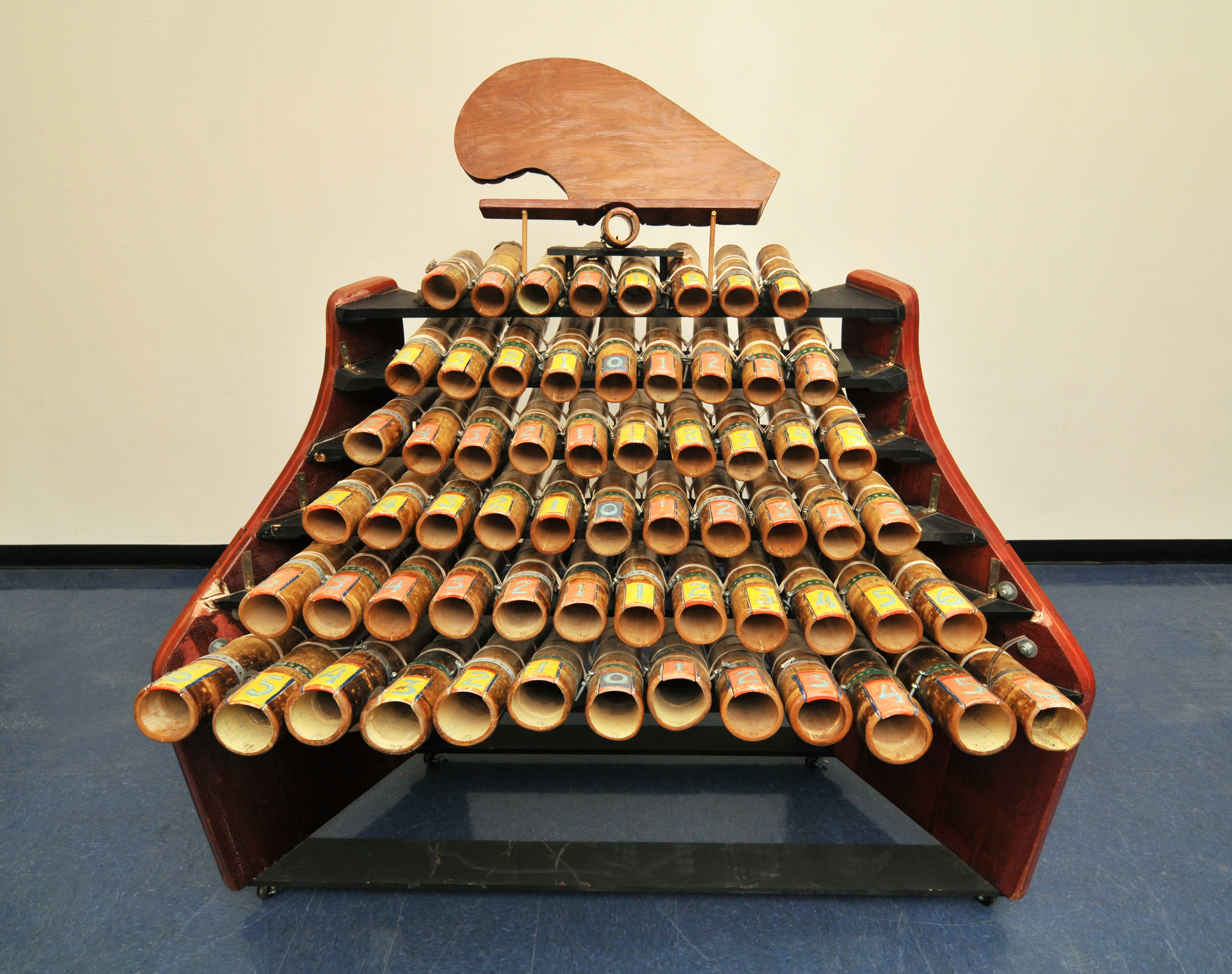
Boo II

Nicknamed "Boo" and "Boo II", the Bamboo Marimbas are marimbas made of bamboo, using the concept of a tongued resonator to produce the tones.

The Boo I was first built in 1955. Some of the bamboo was replaced with larger-diameter pieces in 1963. It has a total of 64 bamboo resonators, organized into six ranks. The back ends of the tubes are sealed.

Boo II was built in 1971. It also has 64 tubes, but the tubes are open at both ends. The tongues cut into the bamboo are approximately 1/6 of the length of the tube in order to produce a harmonic at 6/5 of the fundamental.

== Bass Marimba and Marimba Eroica ==
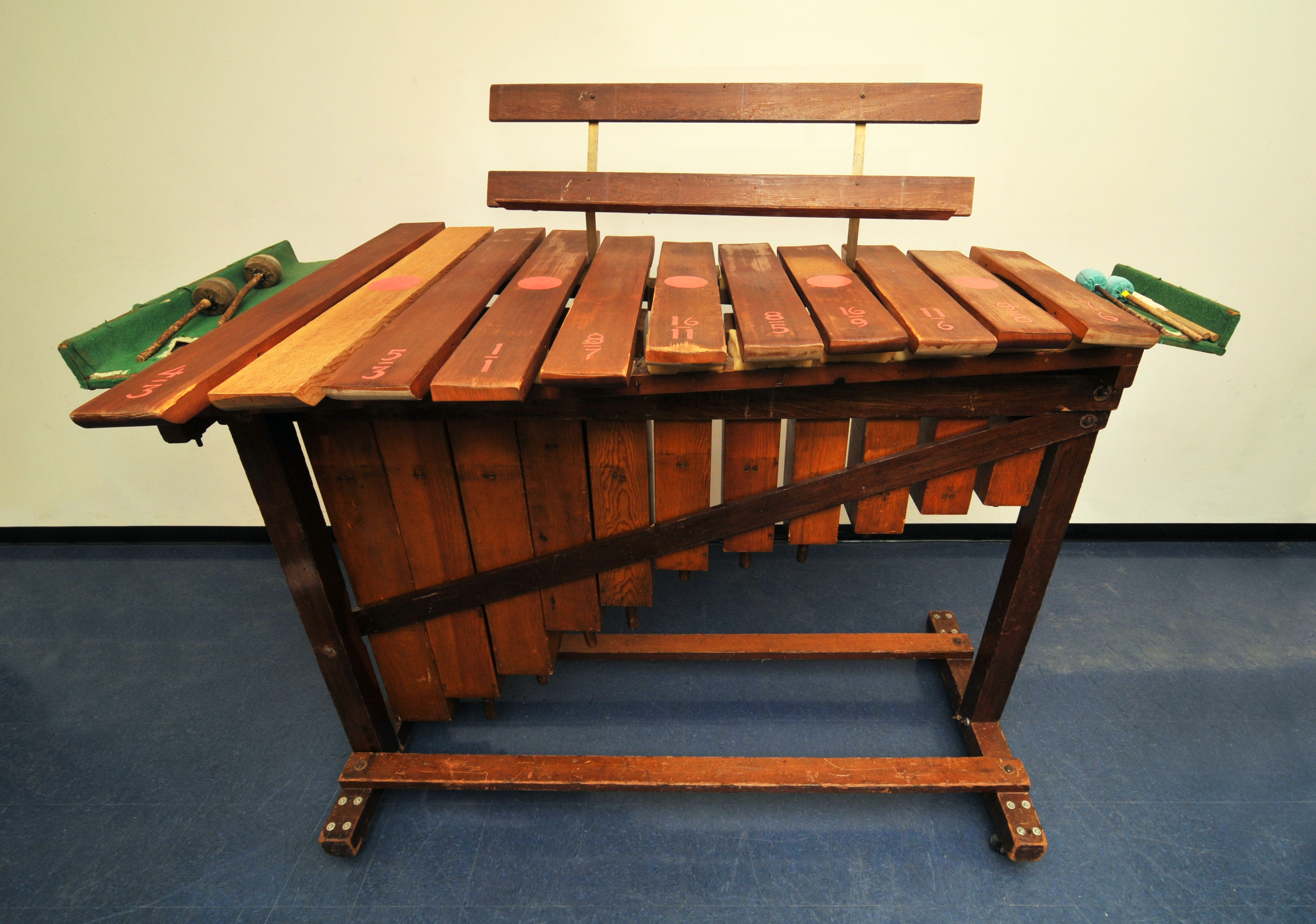
Bass Marimba

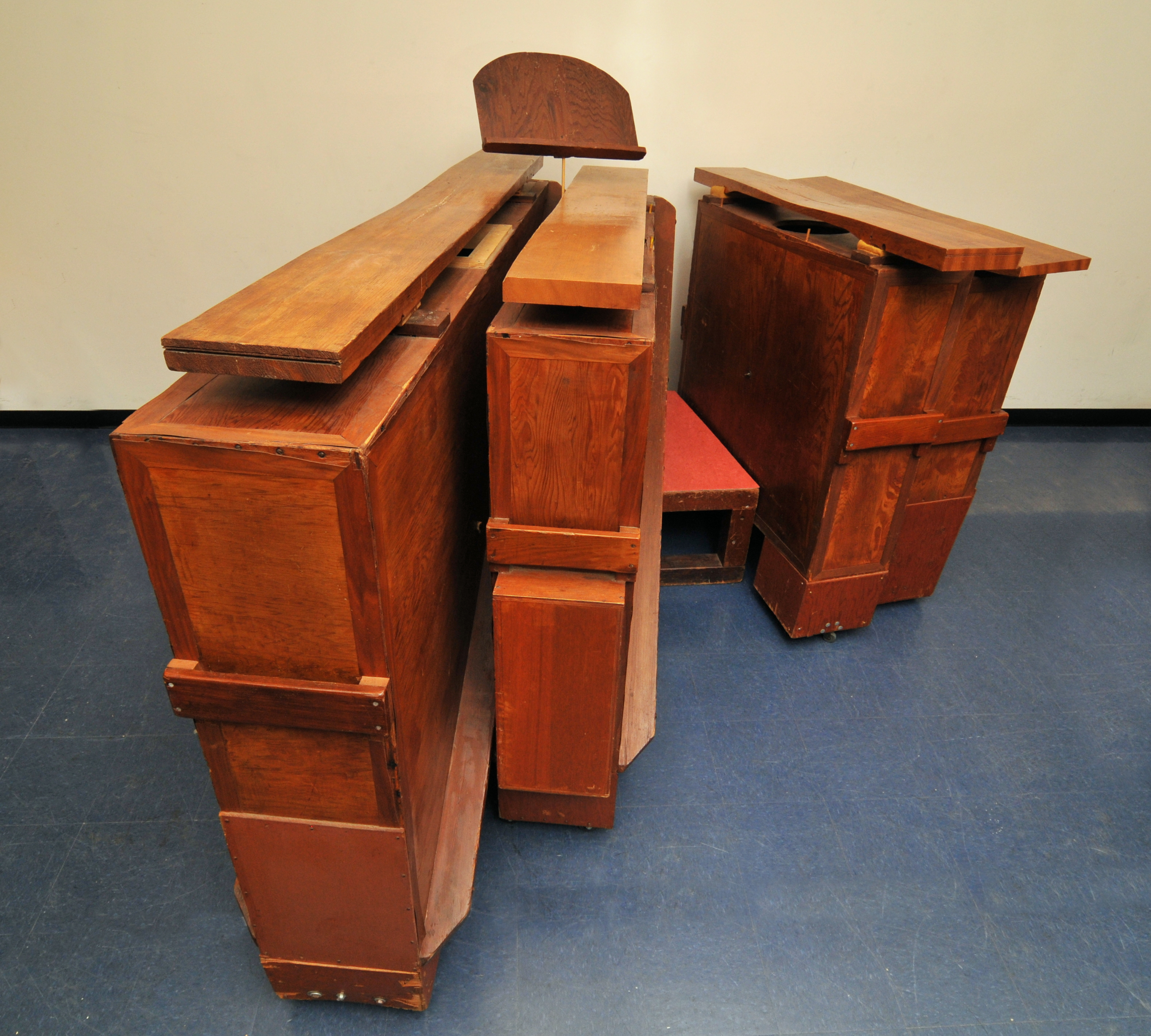
Marimba Eroica

The Bass Marimba and Marimba Eroica have more traditional linear layouts and are very low in pitch.

The Bass Marimba was first built in 1950. It has eleven bars made of Sitka spruce. The lowest bar corresponds to a piano C2. It can be played with mallets or by slapping with the pads of the fingers.

The Marimba Eroica was built in 1954. It comprises four bars of Sitka spruce on top of large resonator boxes. The lowest bar sounds at 22 Hz, approximately F0.

== Chromelodeons ==
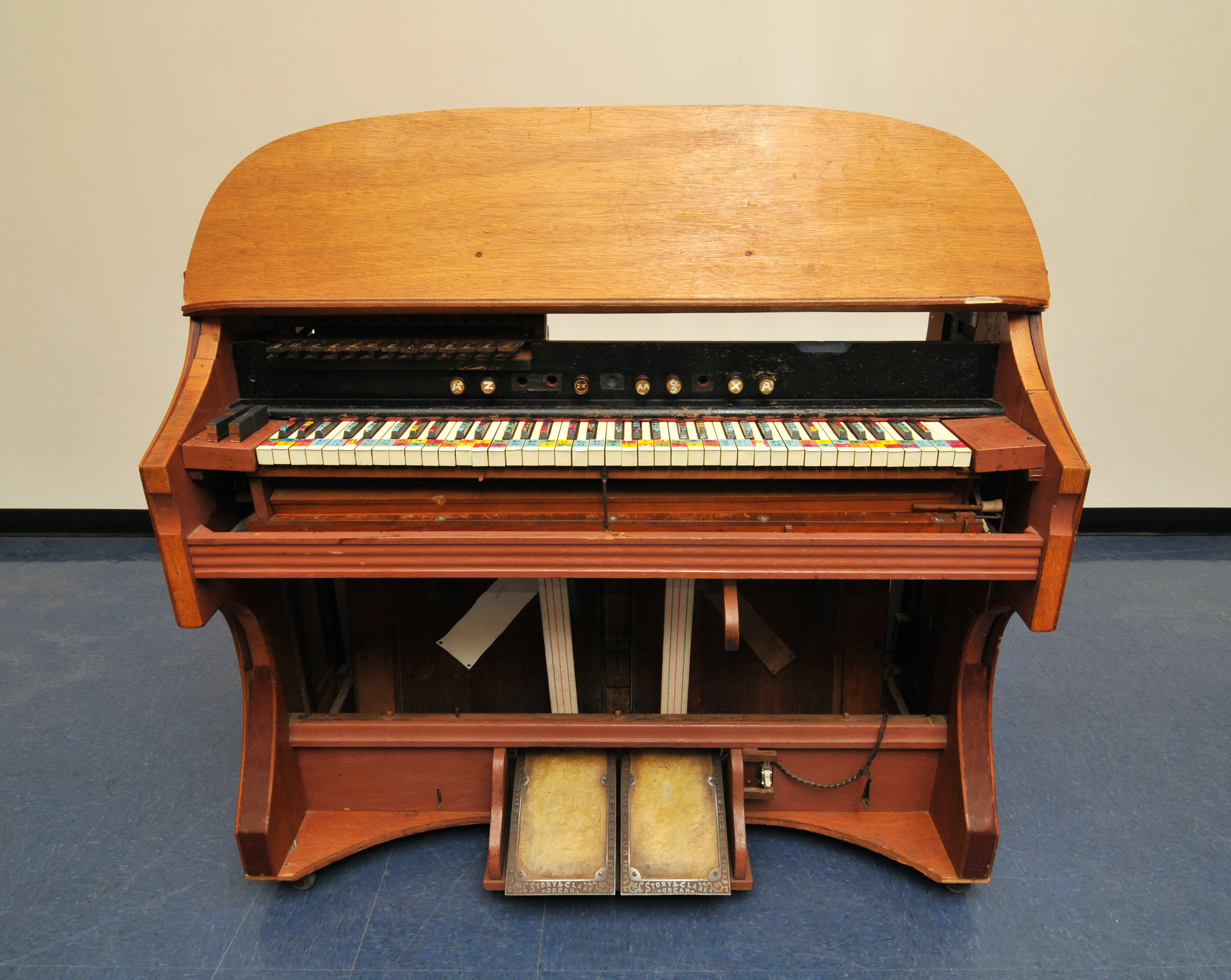
Chromelodeon I

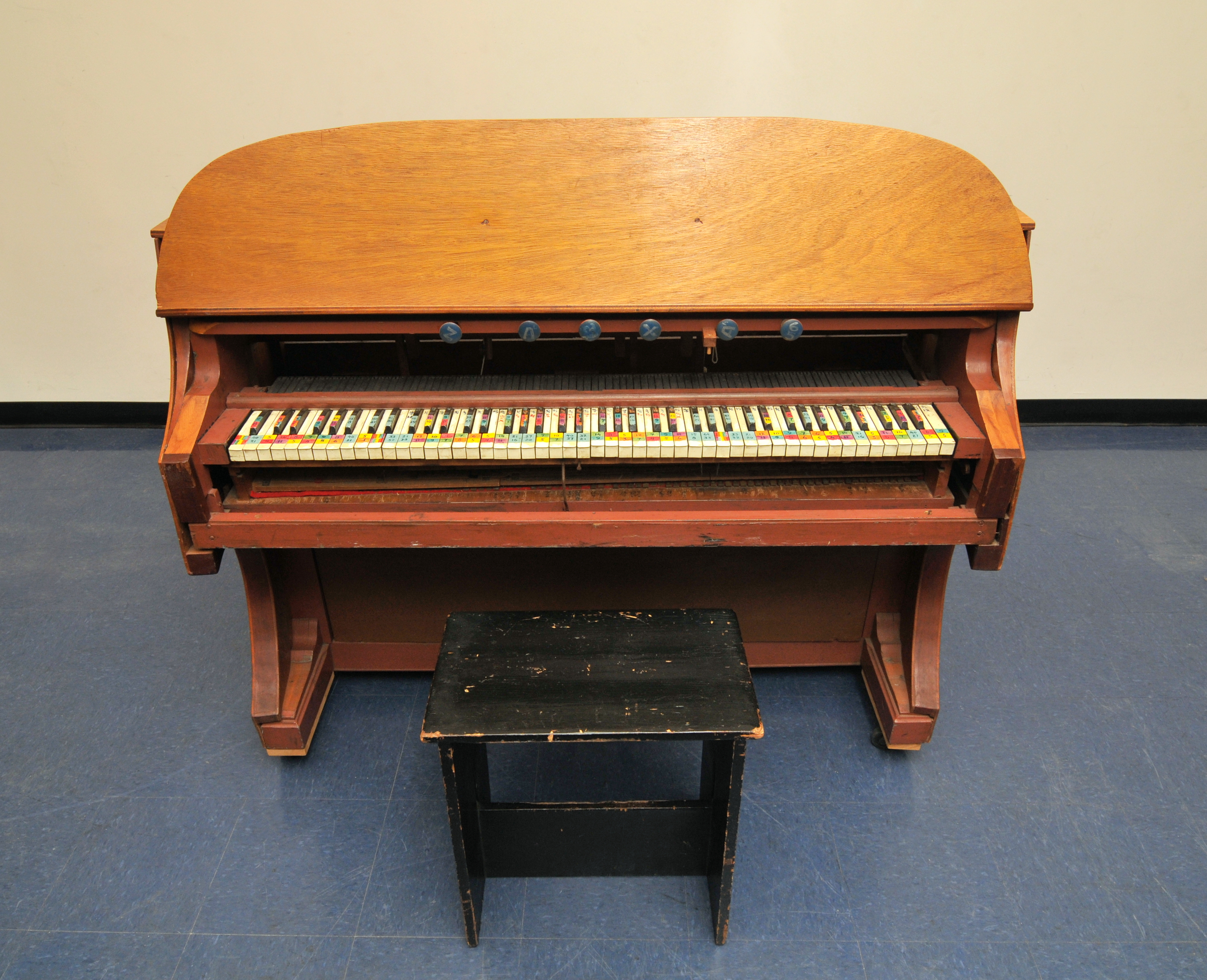
Chromelodeon II

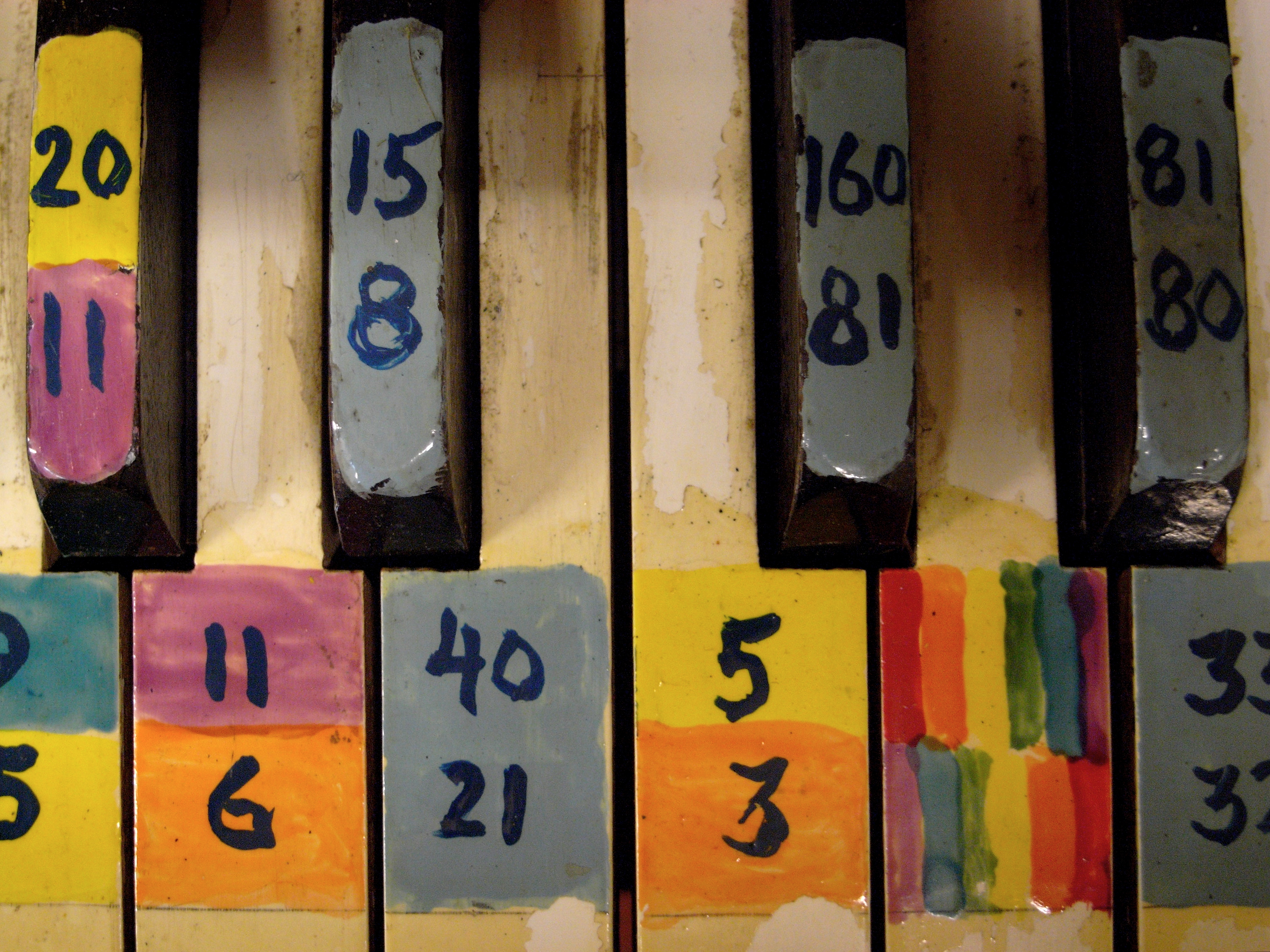
Detail of the keyboard of a Chromelodeon

The Chromelodeons are pump organs modified by Partch to conform to his tonality system. Chromelodeon I was adapted in 1945 from a 73-key pump organ. Chromelodeon II was adapted in 1959 from an 88-key pump organ. Both keyboards have colored and numbered labels representing ratios of the tuning system.

== Cloud-Chamber Bowls ==
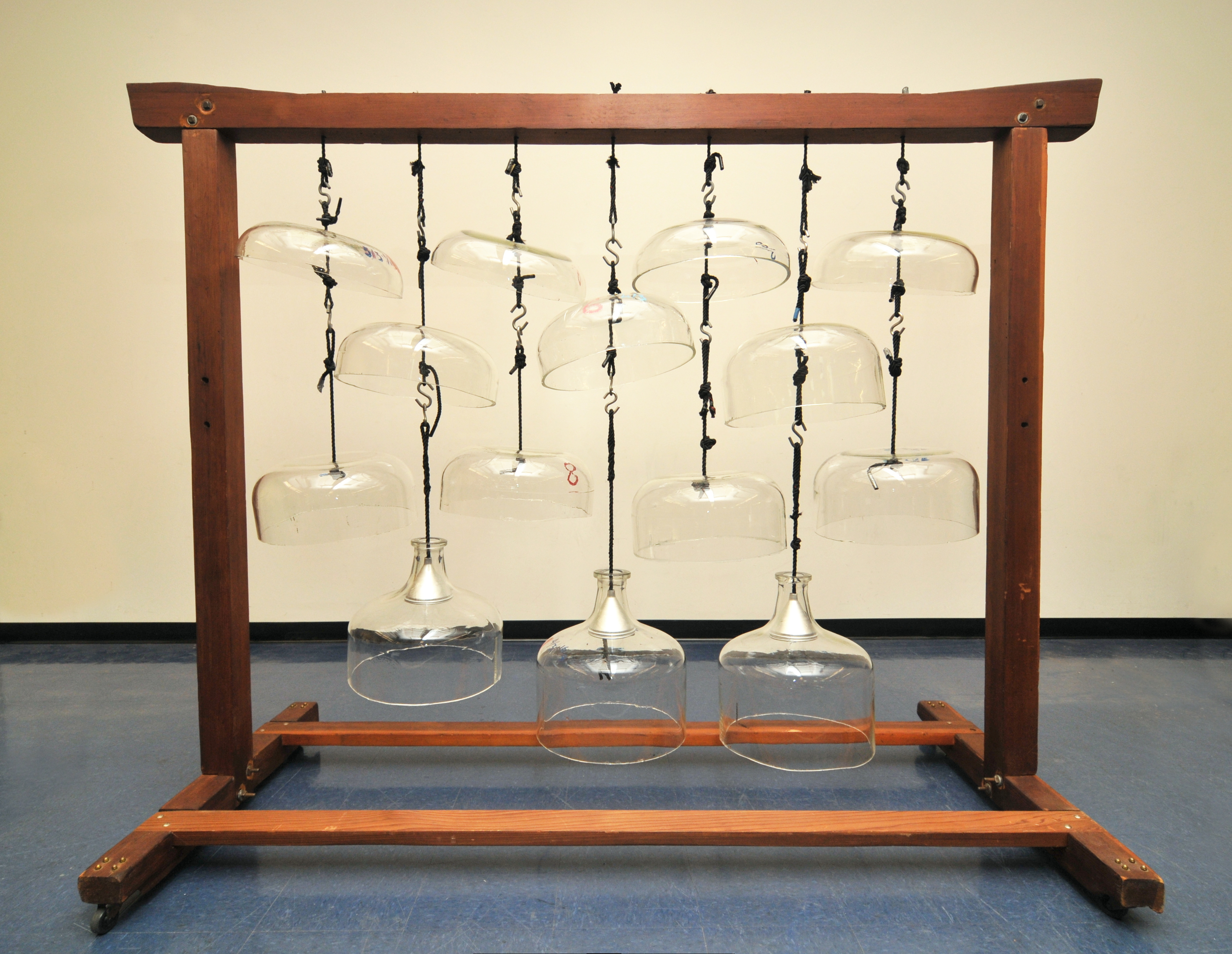
Cloud-Chamber Bowls

The Cloud-Chamber Bowls are a set of 12-US-gallon (45 L), 16-inch diameter Pyrex bowls cut from carboys, suspended in a frame. The carboys were originally sourced from the Berkeley Radiation Laboratory, where they were used in the construction of cloud chambers. It was first built in 1950.

== Diamond Marimba ==
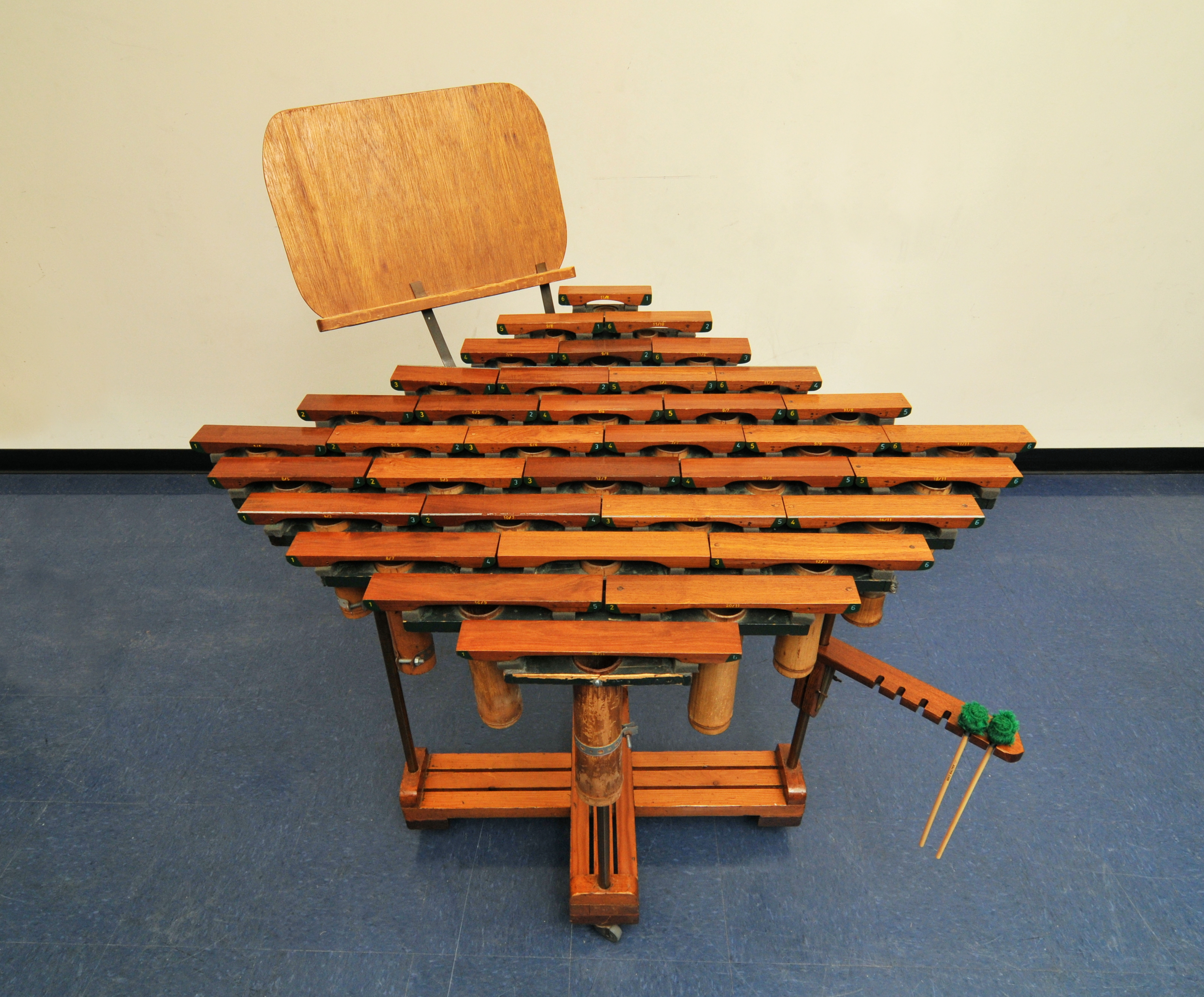
Diamond Marimba

The Diamond Marimba is a marimba with the bars arranged in a physical manifestation of the 11-limit tonality diamond. Partch first built it in 1946.

== Eucal Blossom ==
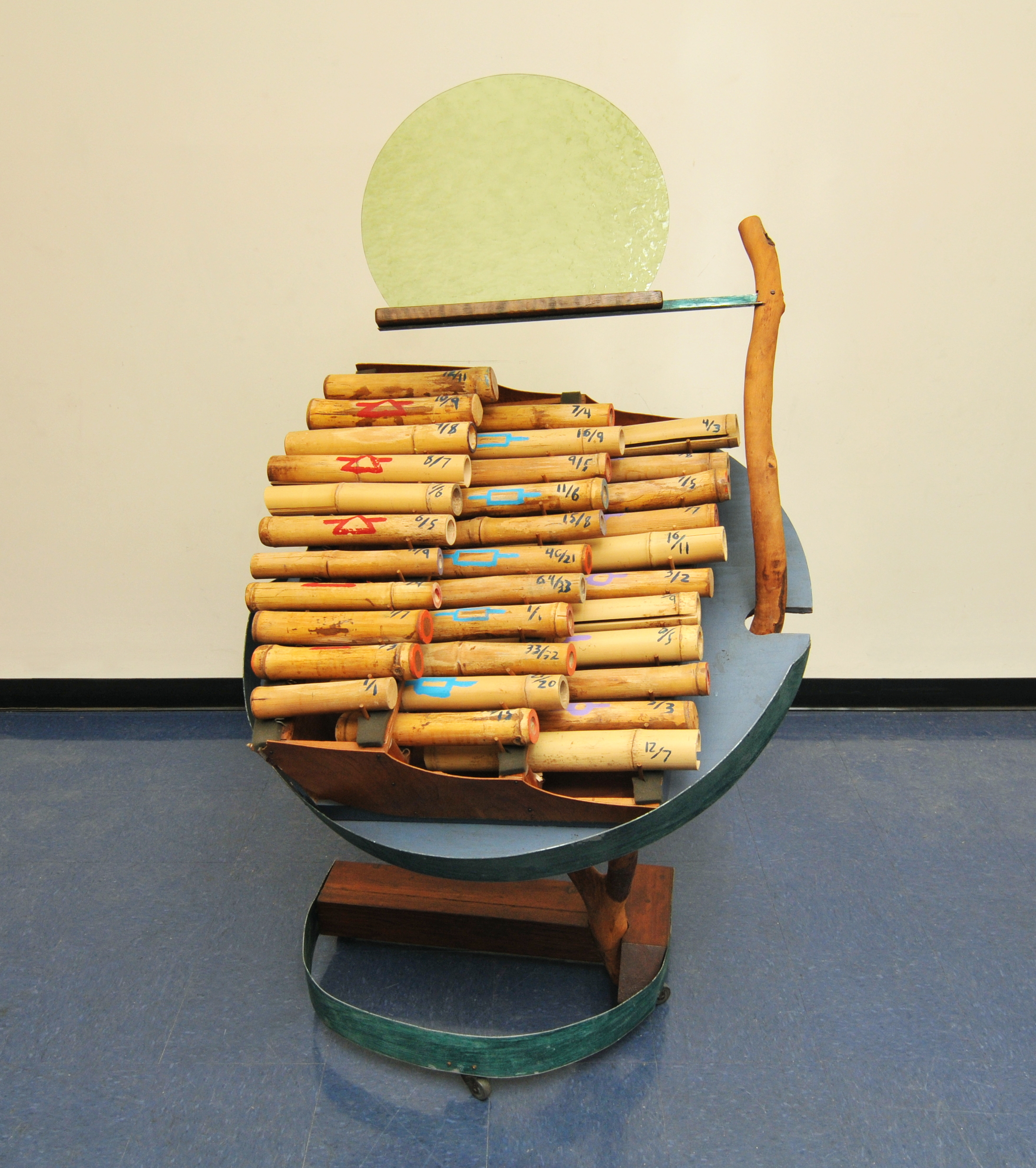
Eucal Blossom

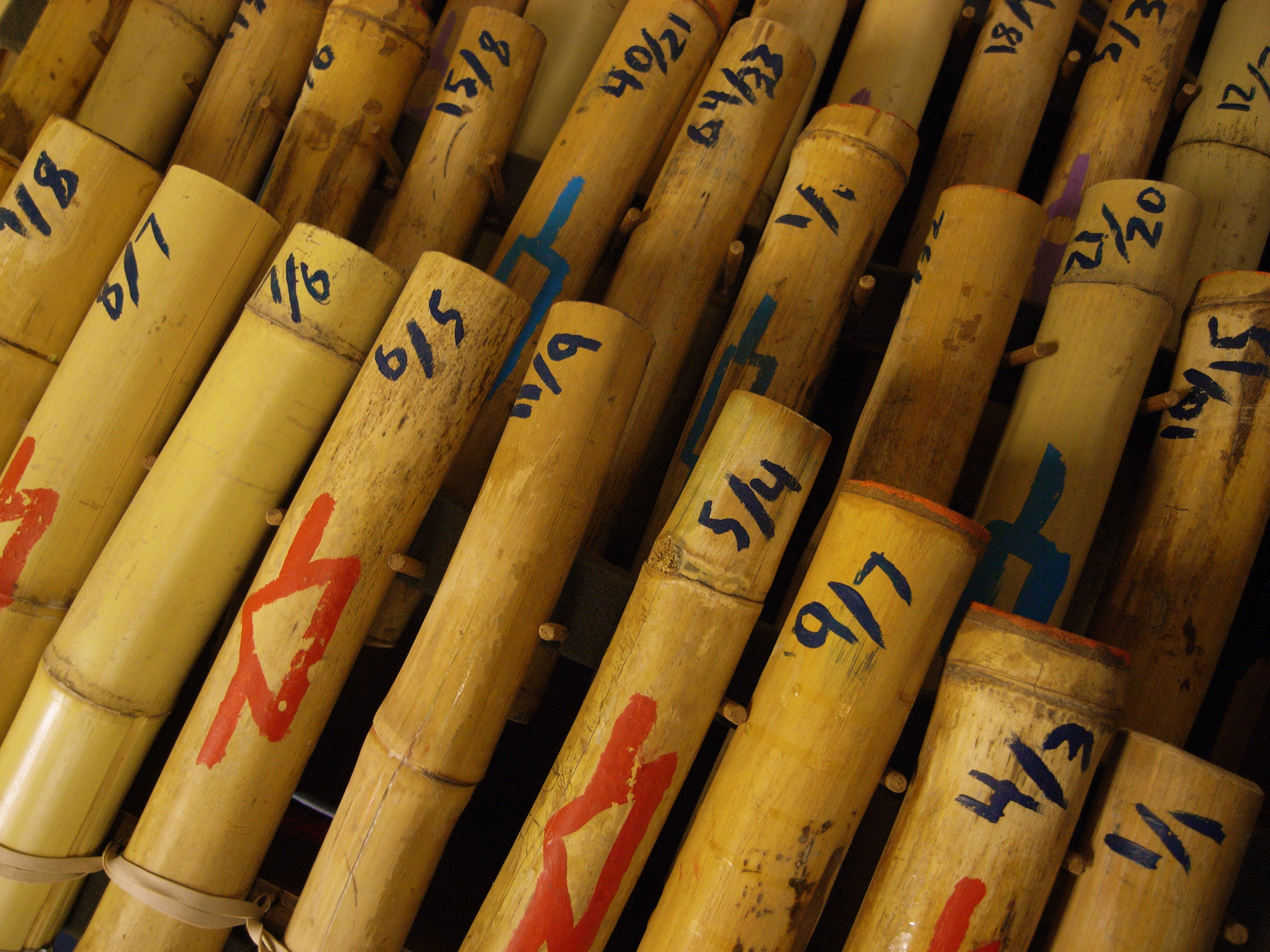
Close-up of the Eucal Blossom showing tonality ratios

The Eucal Blossom is a bamboo marimba with 33 resonators in three rows of eleven, supported by a branch of eucalyptus. It was first built in 1964.

== Gourd Tree and Cone Gongs ==
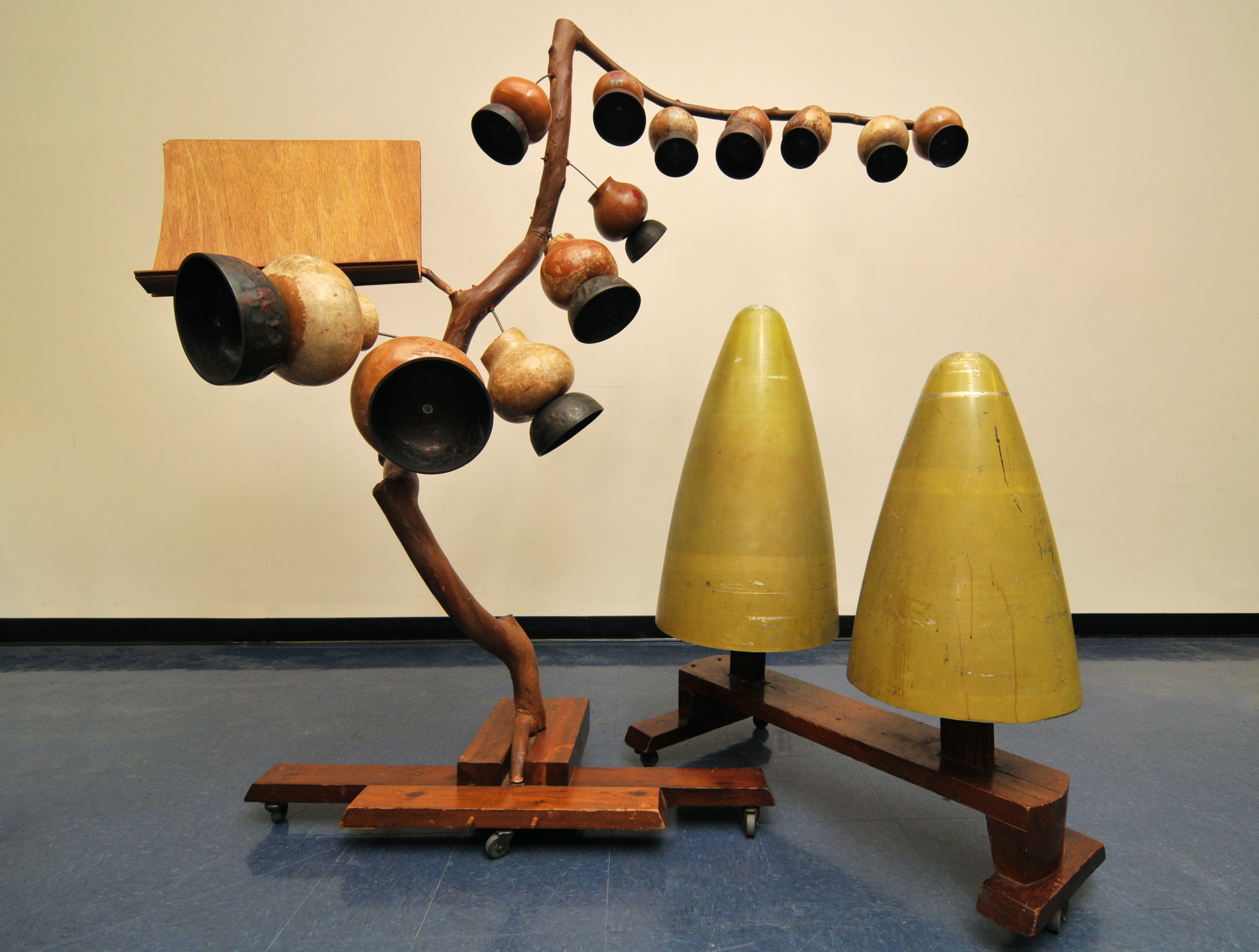
Gourd Tree & Cone Gongs

Twelve temple bells bolted to gourd resonators on a bar of eucalyptus, and two Douglas Aircraft bomber nosecones. First built in 1964.

== Harmonic Canons ==
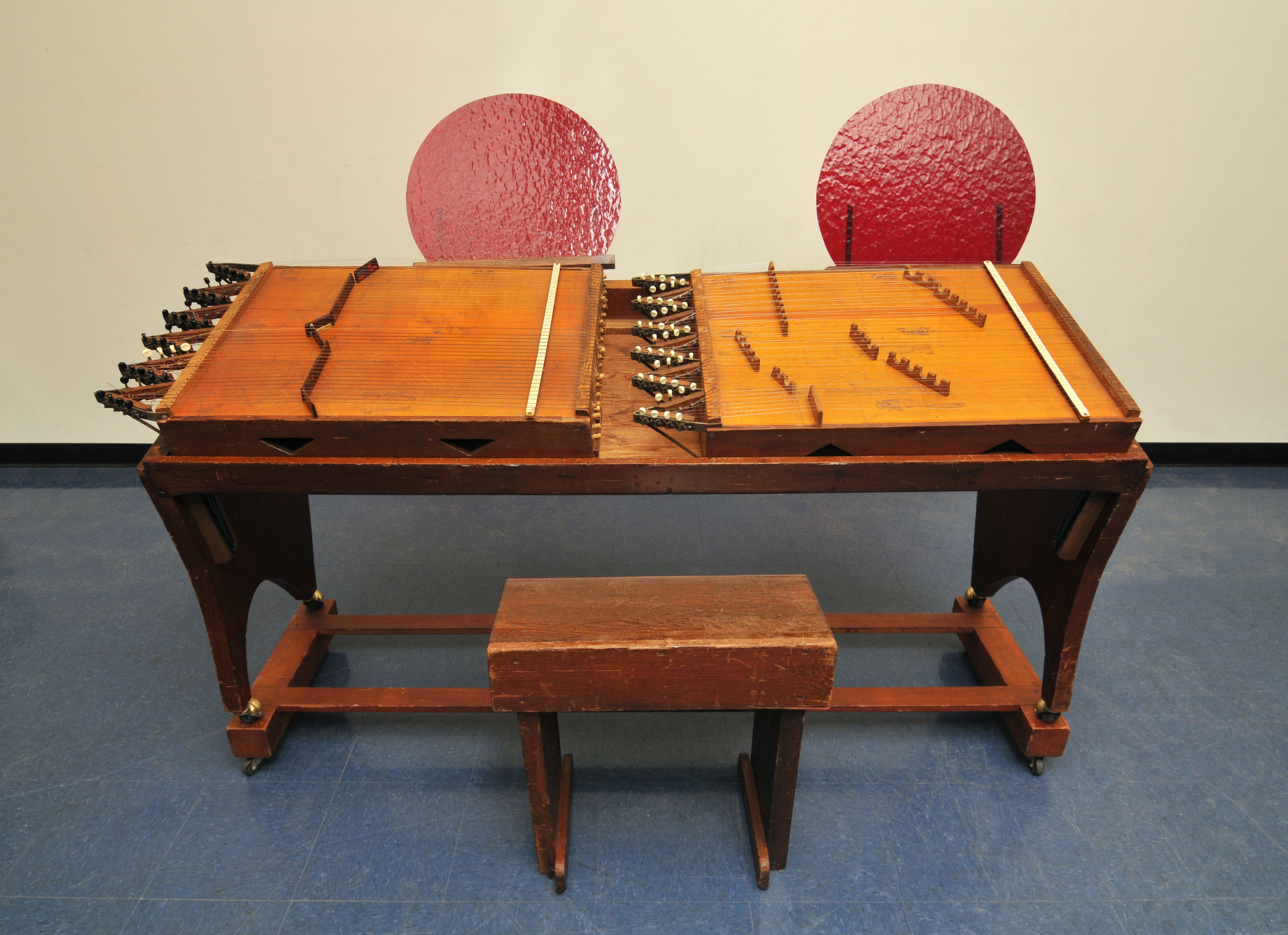
Castor & Pollux
(Harmonic Canon II)

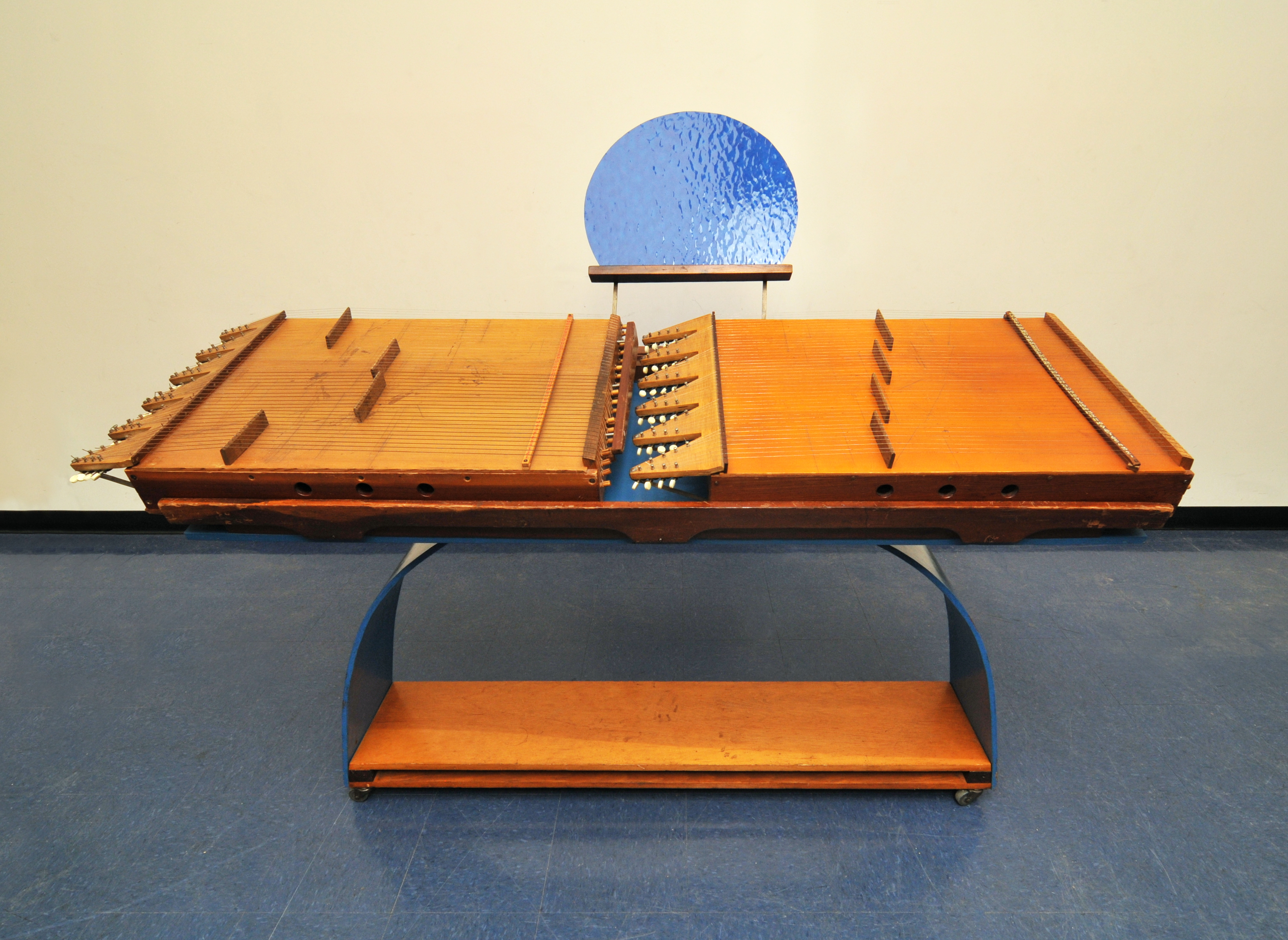
Blue Rainbow
(Harmonic Canon III)

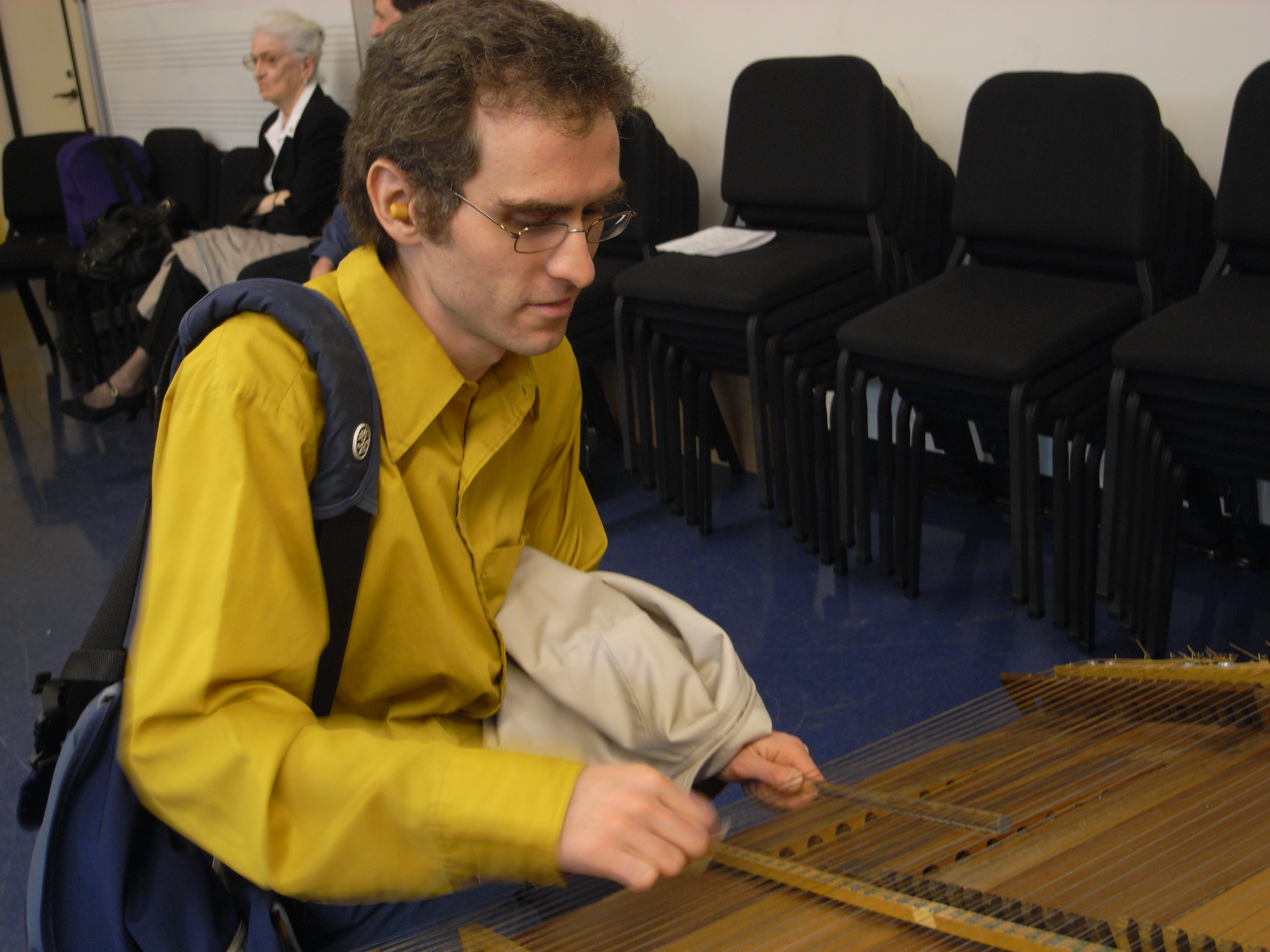
Steve Silverstein tries out a Harmonic Canon.

The Harmonic Canons (from the same root as qanún) are 44-stringed sonometer instruments with complex systems of movable bridges that were mostly positioned by Partch on harmonic nodal positions to get a just intoned harmonic relation between the left and right string part. They are tuned differently depending on the piece, and are played with fingers or picks, or, in some cases, unique mallets.

Harmonic Canon I (1945), II (1953), III (1965).

== Kitharas ==
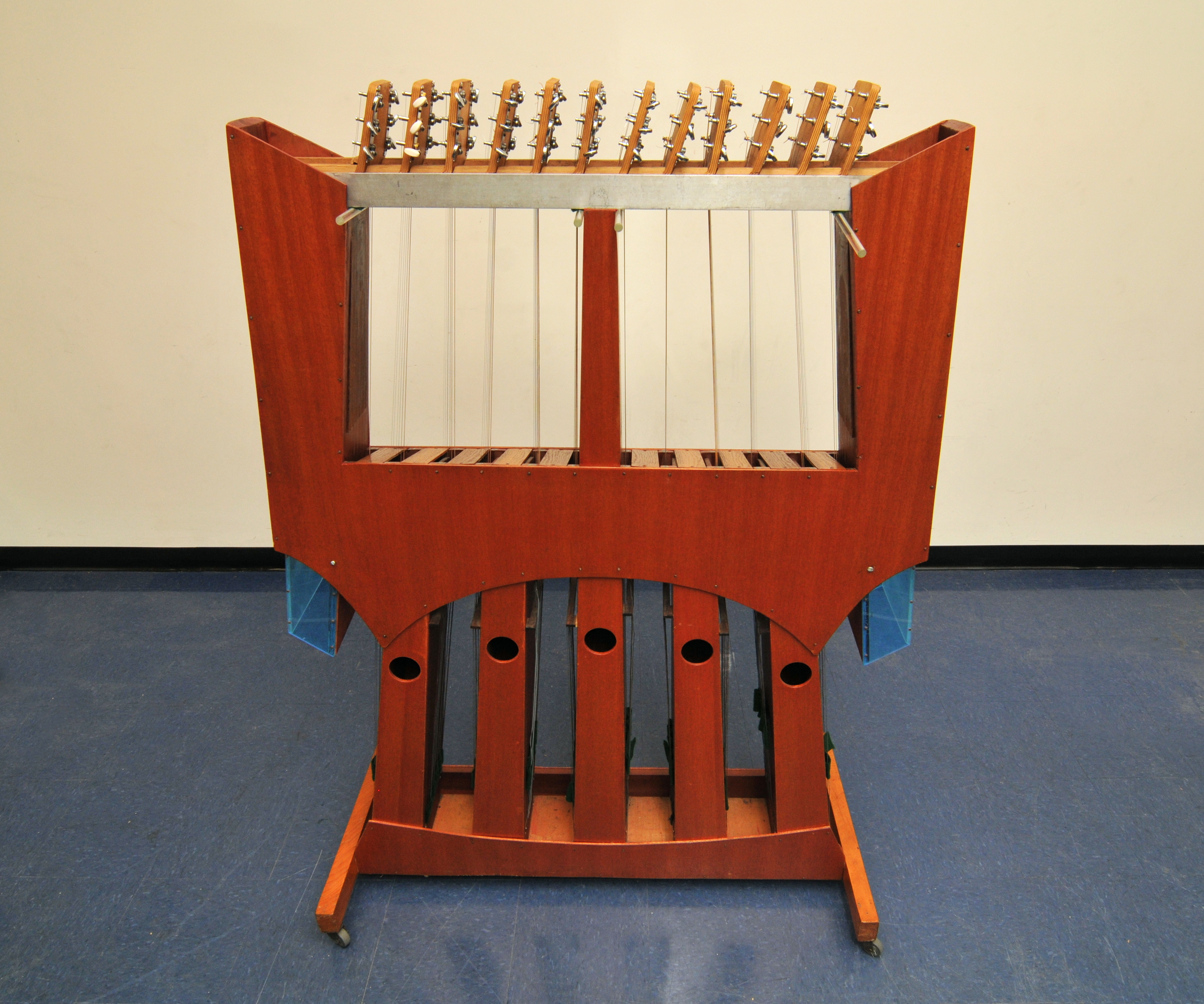
New Kithara I

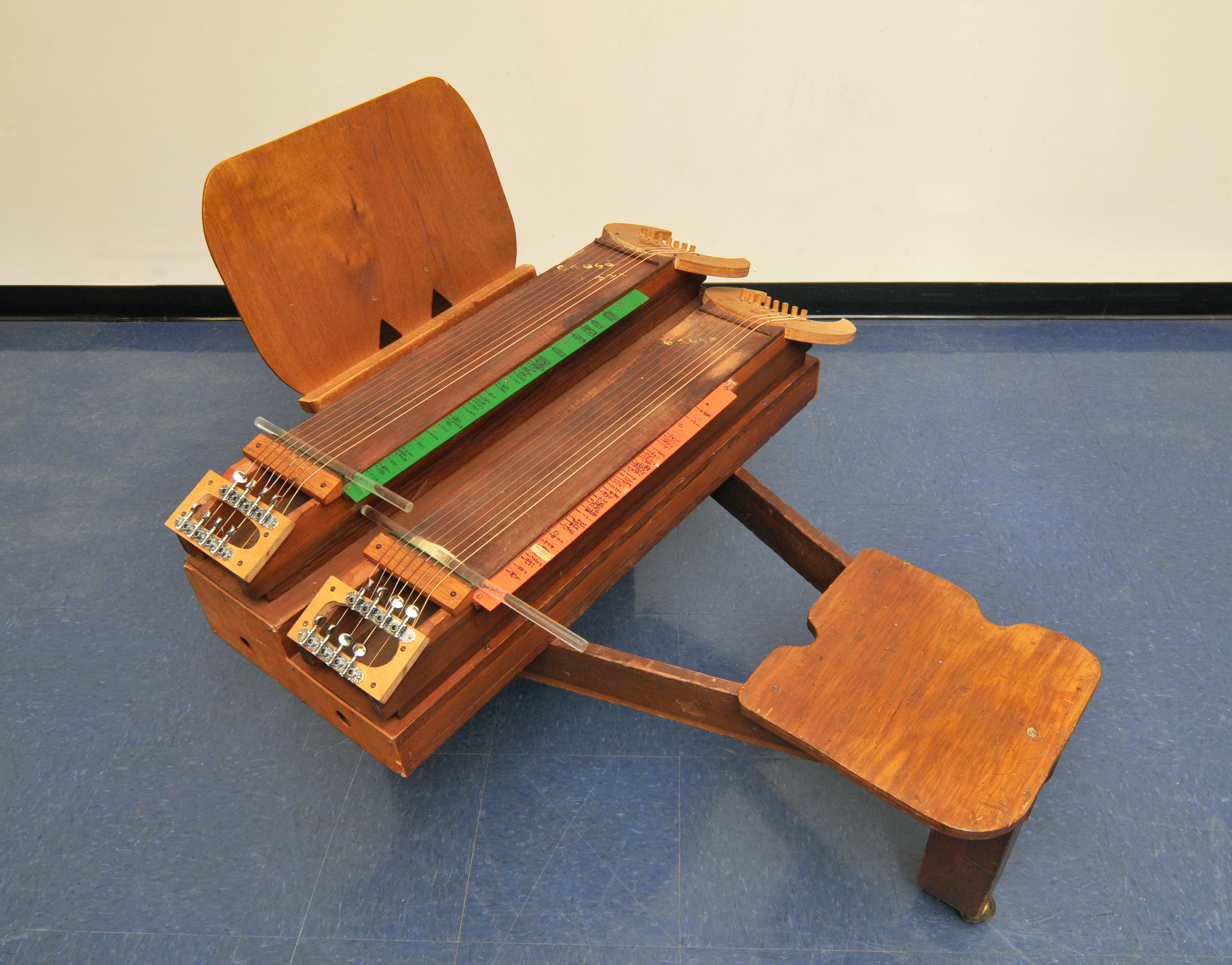
Surrogate Kithara

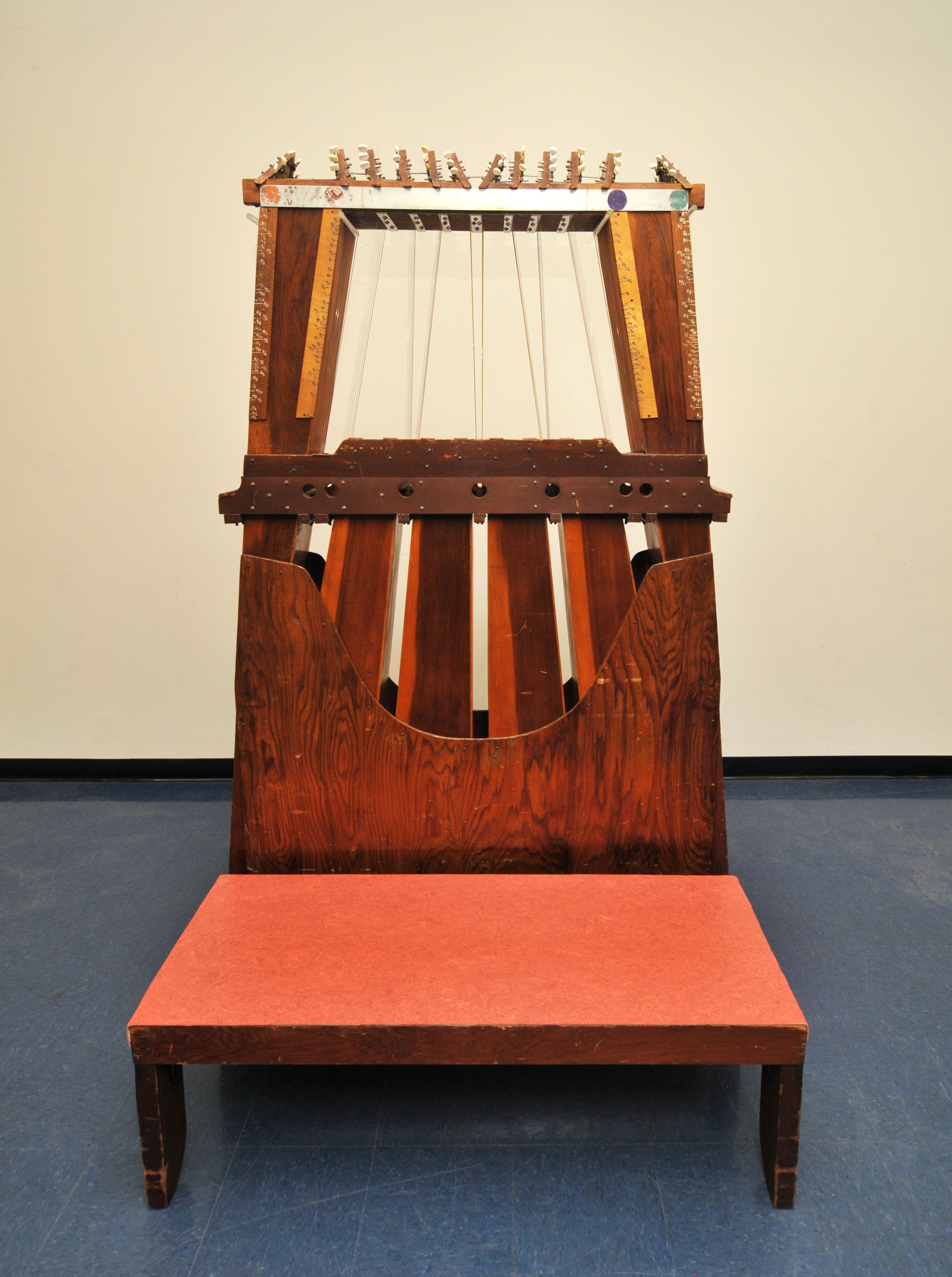
Kithara II

Named after their inspiration, the Greek kithara, the Kitharas are 71-by-43-inch (180 cm × 110 cm) upright 72-stringed instruments, tuned by sliding pyrex rods underneath the strings, and played with fingers or a variety of plectra.

The Kithara I was first built in 1938, and restored in 1972. The Surrogate Kithara was built in 1953, and the Kithara II in 1954.

== Mazda Marimba ==
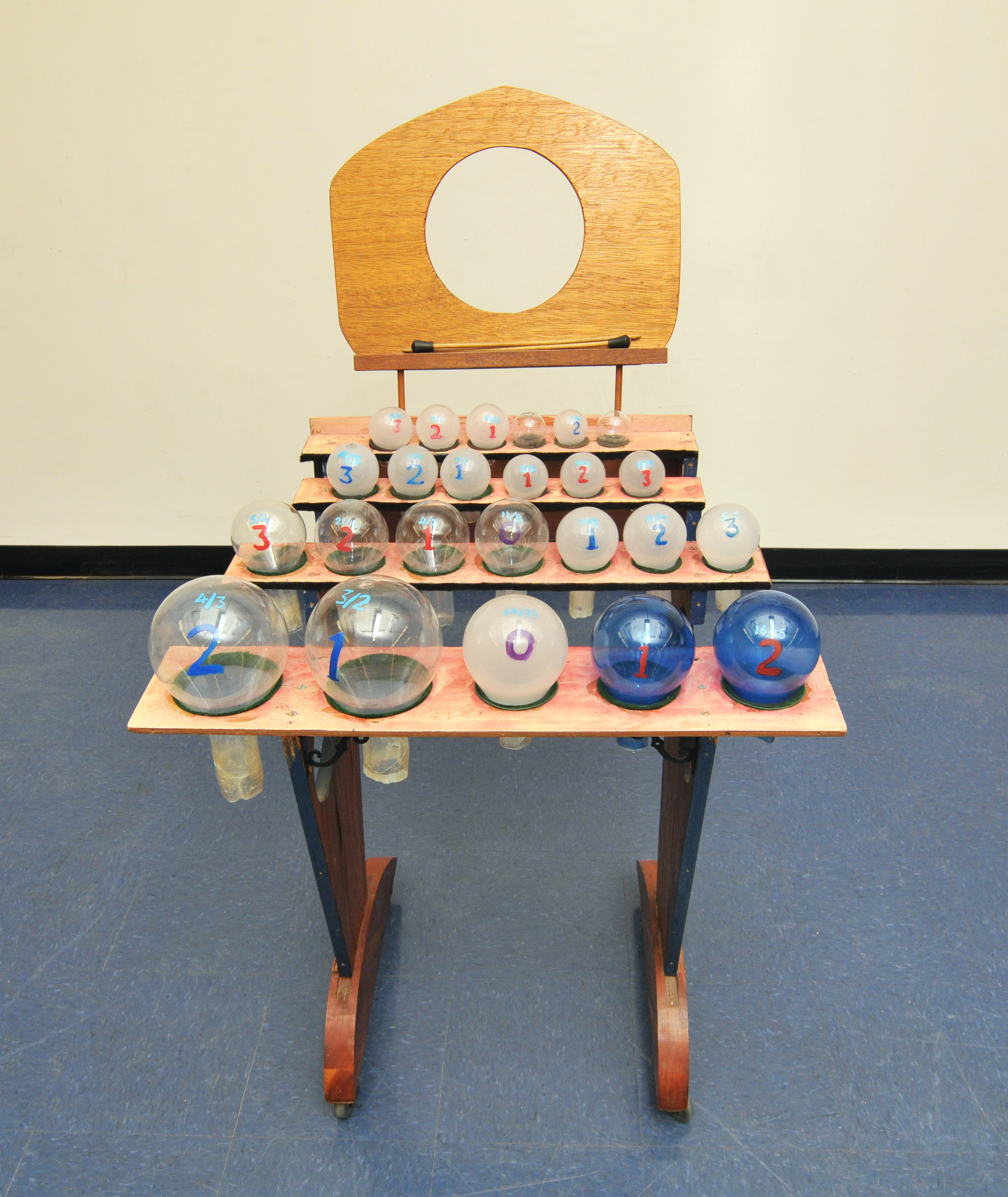
Mazda Marimba

The Mazda Marimba is made of Mazda light bulbs and named after the Zoroastrian god Ahura Mazda.

== Quadrangularis Reversum ==
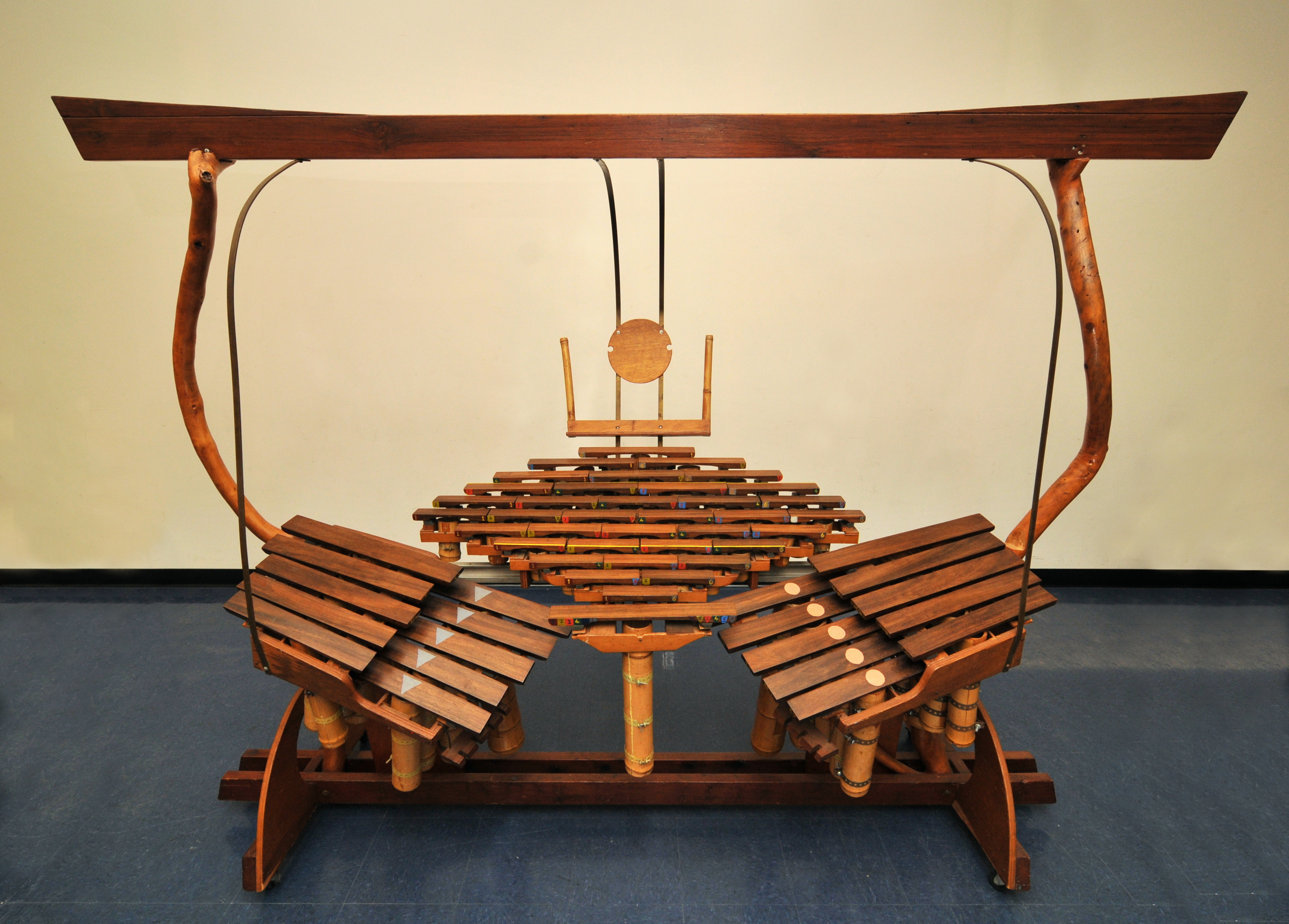
Quadrangularis Reversum

Partch built the Quadrangularis Reversum in 1965, about twenty years after the Diamond Marimba. The central section's 36 African padauk blocks are an upside-down, mirrored version of the Diamond Marimba—hence Reversum. This reverse possibility was shown to Partch by Erv Wilson who helped with its construction. To the left and right are sets of ten alto-register blocks. Bamboo resonators are under the blocks. Partch's initial plan, abandoned due to cost, was to use square bamboo (Chimonobambusa quadrangularis) for the resonators—hence the first part of the instrument's name. The curved uprights are eucalyptus, and the bar across the top is intended to evoke a torii. The instrument is quite large at 103 inches (2.6 m) across the top and 79 inches (2.0 m) tall.

== Spoils of War ==
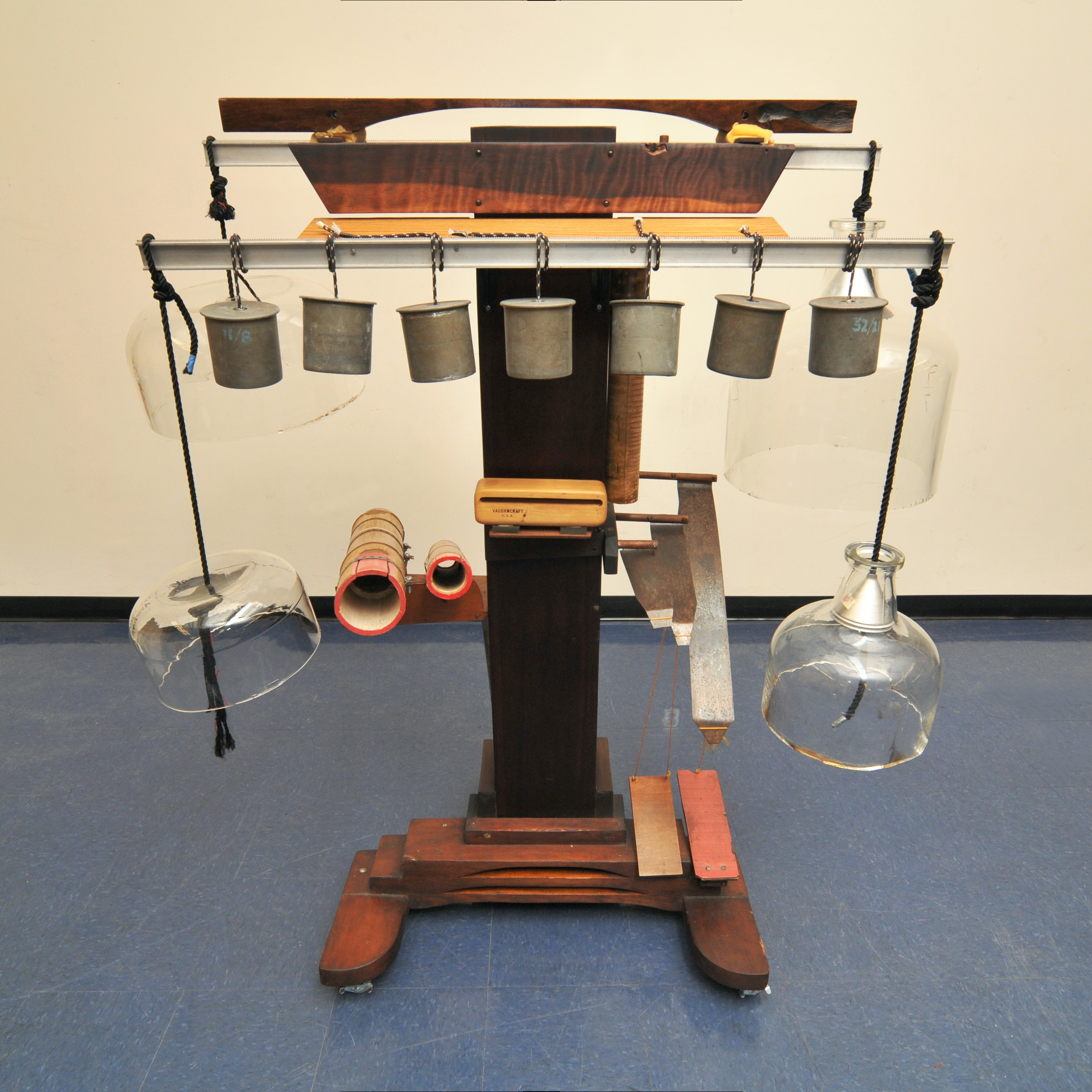
Spoils of War

The Spoils of War is a collection of several instruments, including more Cloud Chamber Bowls, artillery shell casings, metal "whang-guns", a Pernambuco wood block, and a gourd. First built in 1950.

== Zymo-Xyl ==
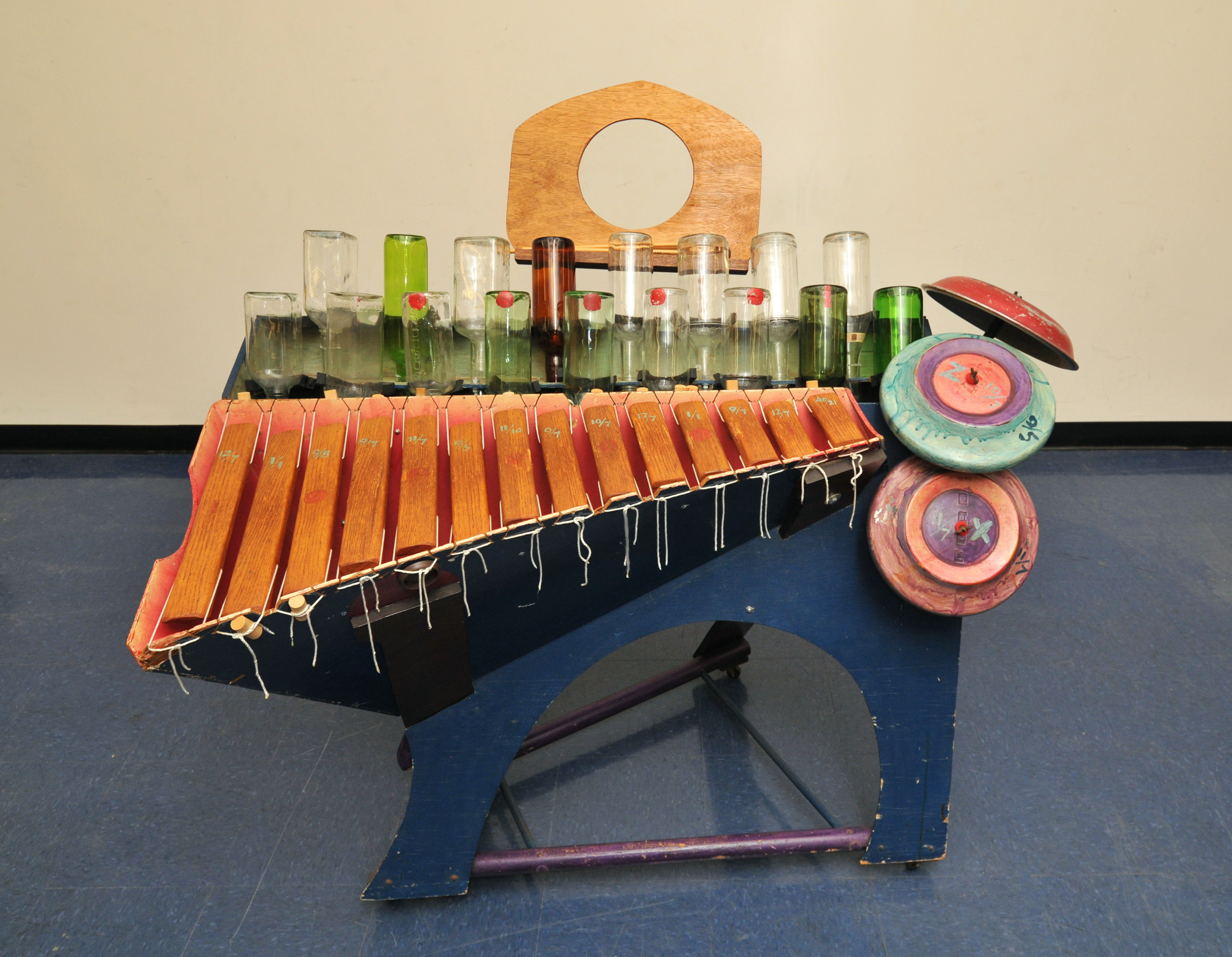
Zymo-Xyl

The Zymo-Xyl is an oak-block xylophone augmented with tuned liquor and wine bottles, Ford hubcaps, and an aluminum ketchup bottle. The name is from the Greek zymo- for "fermentation", and xylo- or xyl- for "wood". First built in 1963.

== See also ==
- Experimental musical instrument
- List of works by Harry Partch
