= Ptolemais (Pamphylia) =

Ancient town that existed in present-day Turkey

Coordinates: 36°36′48″N 31°47′34″E

Ptolemais (Ancient Greek: Πτολεμαΐς) was a coastal town of ancient Pamphylia or of Cilicia, inhabited during Hellenistic times. It was located between the Melas River and Coracesium.

Its site is located near Fığla Burnu, in Asiatic Turkey.
