= Delusion of the Fury =

- Music theatre by Harry Partch
- Based on: Atsumori by Zeami Motokiyo Justice, an Ethiopian folk tale
- Premiere: 9 January 1969; UCLA Playhouse, Los Angeles

Delusion of the Fury is a stage play by the American composer Harry Partch that is based on a Japanese Noh drama.

== History ==
The first draft for singers, mimes, dancers, and musicians was called Cry from Another Darkness; Partch completed it on December 30, 1964. The second draft, dated January 17, 1965, was a fuller, longer piece, re-titled Delusion of the Fury. It was originally conceived as a play in two acts, with a dramatic first act and a comedic second. Partch completed writing of the music on March 17, 1966. The piece employs Partch's original system of micro-tonality, and was written for the largest assembly of his custom-made instruments used in any of his works. The instruments were an important part of the stage set.

Delusion of the Fury, directed by John Crawford, premiered at the UCLA Playhouse on January 9, 1969, where it was recorded for Columbia Records. Its next performance was in 2007 by the Japan Society in New York. In 2013, Delusion of the Fury was staged for the first time in Europe at Ruhrtriennale in Northern Germany by Ensemble MusikFabrik, under the direction of Heiner Goebbels. This production toured to Oslo, Geneva, Amsterdam and the Edinburgh International Festival in 2014. Delusion of the Fury received another performance in Paris as part of IRCAM's ManiFeste festival in the Grande halle de la Villette on June 18, 2016, and also toured to Taichung (Taiwan) and New York (Lincoln Center Festival).

Madeline Tourtelot produced and directed a film of the stage production, titled Delusion of the Fury: A Ritual of Dream and Delusion.

== Background and structure ==
Act I of Delusion of the Fury is based on the Japanese Noh drama Atsumori, which tells the story of a warrior who has been slain in battle. His killer has traveled in remorse to the scene of the killing, so that he may repent. The dead warrior reappears as a ghost to the man. Then his son enters, searching in the belief that he may see a vision of his deceased father. The ghost-father is filled with resentment and lives again through the ordeal of the battle of his death. Eventually, faced with the uselessness of his anger, he seeks reconciliation with both his son and the slayer.

Act II is based on an Ethiopian folk tale, "Justice". The story is as follows: a young man is preparing a meal over a fire when an old goatherder approaches, searching for a lost kid goat. She asks the man if he has seen the kid. The man is deaf, does not understand the question, and subsequently gestures the old woman away. She misunderstands this as direction towards the location of the lost kid, wanders off, and finds it, and returns to offer thanks. Upon her return, the man grows angry and belligerent for being disturbed a second time, and a crowd gathers. The villagers force the two to consult with the Justice of the Peace, who is both deaf and myopic. In yet another misunderstanding, the judge takes the quarrel as a marital dispute, and orders the two to go home together with their 'child'.

These stories illustrate the overarching theme of Delusion of the Fury: the delusory nature and futility of human anger, with the second including a critique of communal justice. Delusion of the Fury thus brings together tragedy and farce into one work, reminiscent of the ancient Greek tradition of following a tragedy with a satyr play. Critics say that Partch, who faced injustice and rejection from the society in which he worked and lived, may have offered this work as a gesture of self-admonishment, a way of confronting his own anger towards his world. Danlee Mitchell claimed that Delusion of the Fury was "Harry's reconciliation with the world."

== Sections ==
No.	Title	Length
1.	"Exordium: The Beginning Of a Web"
2.	"Chorus of Shadows"
3.	"The Pilgrimage"
4.	"Emergence of the Spirit"
5.	"A Son in Search of His Father's Face"
6.	"Cry From Another Darkness"
7.	"Pray For Me"
8.	"Sanctus: An Entr'acte"
9.	"The Quiet Hobo Meal"
10.	"The Lost Kid"
11.	"Time of Fun Together"
12.	"The Misunderstanding"
13.	"Arrest, Trial, and Judgement (Joy in the Marketplace)"
14.	"Pray For Me Again- A Strange Fear!"
