= Genesis of a Music =

Book by Harry Partch

- First edition
- Author: Harry Partch
- Language: English
- Genre: Non-fiction
- Publisher: The University of Wisconsin Press
- Publication date: 1949

The 11-limit tonality diamond, part of the basis for Partch's music theory

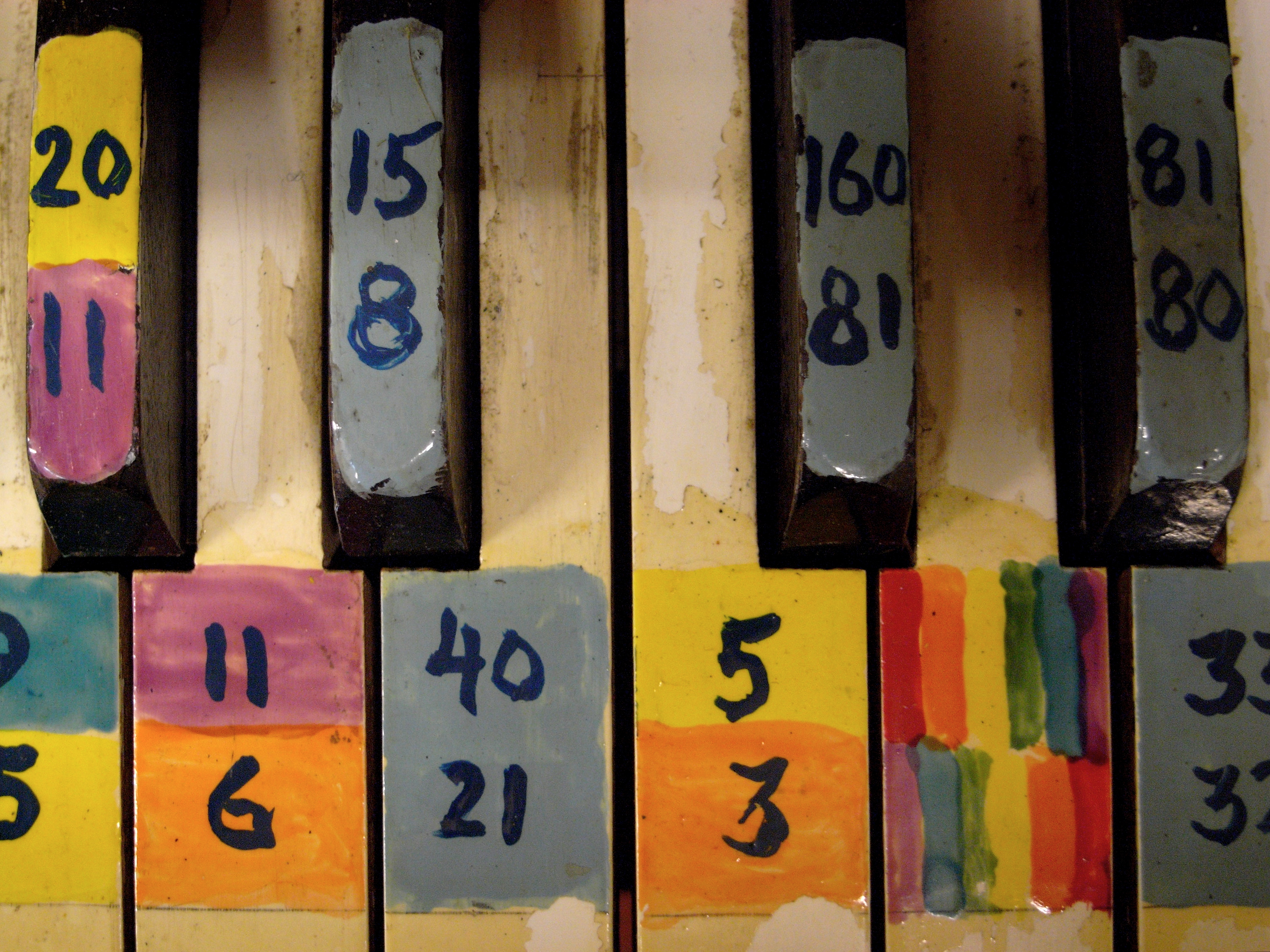
Part of the keyboard of the Chromelodeon

Genesis of a Music is a book first published in 1949 by microtonal composer Harry Partch (1901–1974).

Partch first presents a polemic against both equal temperament and the long history of stagnation in the teaching of music; according to Alex Ross, this is "the most startling forty-five-page history of music ever written". In particular, Partch holds Johann Sebastian Bach responsible for "the movement toward equal-tempered tuning, which meant that composers could not absorb the scales of other world traditions; and the urge to make music ever more instrumental and abstract."

He then goes on to explain his tuning theory based on just intonation, the ensemble of musical instruments of his own invention (such as the "Surrogate Kithara, a struck-string, harplike instrument", and the guitar with movable frets he used to compose Barstow), and several of his largest musical compositions.

The book has been highly influential to succeeding generations of microtonal composers, including Lou Harrison, Ben Johnston, and James Tenney. A revised and enlarged second edition was published just before Partch's death in 1974.

== Concepts ==
Partch presents 4 "basic monophonic concepts":

1. Consonance and dissonance: "The ear informs us that tones which are in small-number proportion, say in the relation of 2 to 1, are strong, clear, powerful, consonant."
  - "The smaller the number involved in the [interval] ratios, the more consonant the ratio; the larger the numbers, the more dissonant".
2. "Dual Identity": "Every ratio of a Monophonic system is at least a dual identity."
  - "Odentity [is] determined by the odd-number ratio component of the numerator, and another one, the Udentity [is] determined by the odd-number component of the denominator. A ratio thus always belongs to two tonalities, an Otonality in accordance with its Odentity, and an Utonality in accordance with its Udentity."
3. Minor: "Under-number Tonality, or Utonality ("minor"), is the immutable faculty of ratios, which in turn represent an immutable faculty of the human ear."
  - See: Arithmetic progression and Undertone series
4. History: Music has appeared to have advanced up the harmonic series throughout history.
  - Pythagorean tuning is 3-limit, "just intonation" often refers to 5-limit tuning, while Partch uses an 11-limit tuning. Partch admirer Ben Johnston uses 31-limit or higher "extended just intonation". See: Emancipation of the dissonance

== Editions ==
- Genesis of a Music: Monophony: the relation of its music to historic and contemporary trends; its philosophy, concepts, and principles; its relation to ... and its application to musical instruments, University of Wisconsin Press, 362 pp., 1949. ASIN B0007DM7I8
- Genesis Of A Music: An Account Of A Creative Work, Its Roots, And Its Fulfillments, Second Edition, Da Capo Press, Paperback, 544 pp., 1979. ISBN 0-306-80106-X. 2009: ISBN 9780786751006.
