= Mathew Rosenblum =

American composer (born 1954)

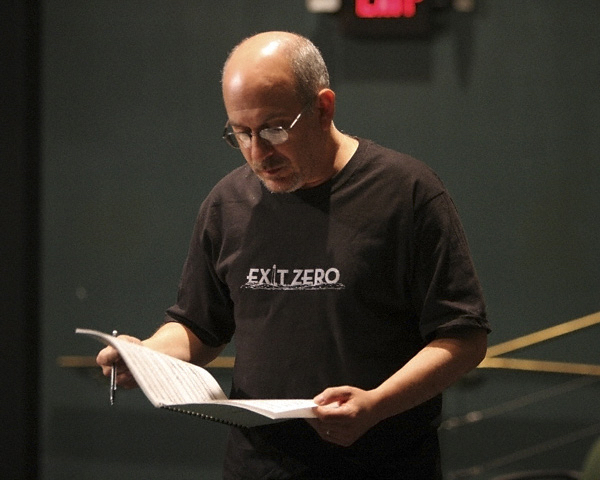
- Rosenblum, at a rehearsal.
- Born: March 19, 1954 (age 72); New York, New York, US
- Education: New England Conservatory of Music (MM, 1979)
- Alma mater: Princeton University (PhD, 1992)
- Occupations: Composer, professor, presenter
- Years active: 1978–present

Mathew Rosenblum (born March 19, 1954) is an American composer whose works have been commissioned, recorded and performed by musical groups such as the Pittsburgh Symphony Orchestra, the Boston Modern Orchestra Project, the Thailand Philharmonic Orchestra, the American Composers Orchestra, Opera Theater of Pittsburgh, FLUX Quartet, the New York New Music Ensemble, the Raschèr Saxophone Quartet, the Pittsburgh New Music Ensemble, and Newband among other ensembles, in venues throughout North America, Europe and Asia including the Andy Warhol Museum, Leipzig's Gewandhaus, the Tonhalle Düsseldorf, Thailand's Prince Mahidol Hall, as well as Merkin Hall, the Guggenheim Museum, the Miller Theatre, The Kitchen, Carnegie Recital Hall, and Symphony Space in New York City. Rosenblum's music has been recorded on such labels as Mode Records, New World Records, Albany Records, Capstone Records, Opus One Records, New Focus Recordings, and the Composers Recordings Inc. label, and has been published by Edition Peters, of Leipzig, London, and New York.

== Early life ==
Rosenblum was born in Flushing, Queens and began playing the saxophone at age eight. He attended the High School of Music and Art ("Music & Art") as an instrumentalist, where his interest turned to free jazz. At Music & Art, he met jazz performers Anthony Coleman and David Krakauer, and performed with them from 1970-73 at venues throughout New York City. In college, Rosenblum studied music composition at Boston's New England Conservatory of Music ("NEC") (B.M. 1977, M.M. 1979) and Princeton University (MFA 1981, PhD 1992) with composers Milton Babbitt, Donald Martino, Paul Lansky, Jaki Byard, and Malcolm Peyton, while also working privately with composer Burr Van Nostrand. During and after his time at NEC and Princeton, Rosenblum's work was also closely associated with composers Lee Hyla, Ezra Sims, Dean Drummond and Eric Moe.

== Career ==
Rosenblum joined the Department of Music of the University of Pittsburgh in 1991, where he has been a Professor of Music Composition and Theory, Chair of the Department of Music, and codirector of both the "Music on the Edge" new music series as well as the biannual "Beyond: Microtonal Music Festival" (copresented by the Andy Warhol Museum). Among the awards he has received in over four decades as a composer include a Guggenheim Fellowship, a National Endowment for the Arts Music Fellowship Grant, two Fromm Foundation Commissions, a Barlow Endowment Commission, several MacDowell Colony and Yaddo Residency Fellowships, and multiple "Featured Composer" and "Composer in Residence" honors at music festivals and colleges in the United States and Asia.

== Music ==
The Grove Dictionary of Music and Musicians has described Rosenblum as "a leading voice in American microtonal music [who] attempts a synthesis of elements from classical, jazz, rock and world music in his work". New York's WQXR-FM has cited "Rosenblum's customary 21-note-per-octave microtonal scale, combining the 12 notes of the piano with [the] intervals that fall somewhere between the keys", while The New York Times has called Rosenblum a composer who "mix[es] surreal microtonal scales [and] seductive melodies". A 2018 review in Stereophile Magazine described Rosenblum as a composer who "blends percussion, acoustic instruments, electronics, voice, and microtonal elements in visceral, moving ways." Many of Rosenblum’s compositions have employed a similar "integration of diverse compositional elements". Rosenblum himself has cited his "long-standing love for Javanese music... and the music of LaMonte Young" as central influences on his work.

== Honors and awards ==
- Faculty Composer, New Music on the Point Festival, Vermont, U.S.A. (2017)
- Featured Composer, ASEAN Music Week, Nanning, China (2016)
- Featured Composer, Thailand International Composition Festival (2015)
- “Composer of the Year,” Pittsburgh Symphony Orchestra (2014)
- Guggenheim Fellowship (2013)
- Barlow Endowment Commission (2011)
- Composer in Residence, Dickinson College (2011)
- Featured Composer and guest lecturer at the Festival of New American Music in Sacramento (1998, 2010)
- Senior Faculty Composer, June in Buffalo (2009)
- Pennsylvania Council on the Arts Music Fellowship Grants (1994, 1998, 2006, 2008)
- Composer in Residence, Cleveland State University (2008)
- Fromm Foundation Music Commission (1993, 2004)
- Heinz Endowments Creative Heights Residency Grant (2004)
- Meet The Composer Commissioning Music/USA Commission (2003)
- National Endowment for the Arts Music Fellowship Grant (1992)
- New York Foundation for the Arts Artists Fellowship Grant (1989)
- Residencies at the MacDowell Colony, Yaddo, Djerassi Artists Residency, and the Virginia Center for the Creative Arts.
- Awards and fellowships from the New Jersey State Council on the Arts, the Rockefeller Foundation, and the BMI Foundation.

== Selected works ==
- Lament/Witches' Sabbath for clarinet and orchestra, written for David Krakauer and the Boston Modern Orchestra Project (2017)
- Gymnopédies Nos. 3-7/Kiki Wearing Tasha for flute, clarinet, violin, and cello, commissioned by the Boston Microtonal Society (2017)
- Bì nàn suô for five players, commissioned by Music from China (2017)
- Portal, site-specific eight channel sound installation, commissioned by the University of Pittsburgh Art Gallery (2015)
- Last Round (Ostatnia Runda) for string quartet and six percussionists, written for FLUX Quartet and Mantra Percussion (2015)
- Eliza Furnace for orchestra, commissioned by the Pittsburgh Symphony Orchestra (2013)
- Falling for soprano, ensemble, and electronics, commissioned by the Barlow Endowment (2013)
- Northern Flicker for solo percussion, written for Lisa Pegher (2012)
- Sharpshooter for orchestra (2012)
- Two Harmonies for viola, percussion, and piano, commissioned by Andrew Zientek (2011)
- Throat for clarinet and percussion, commissioned by Jean Kopperud for the Rated X Project (2010)
- Double Concerto for baritone saxophone, percussion, and orchestra commissioned by the Fromm Foundation (2010)
- The Big Rip for saxophone quartet and vocal ensemble, commissioned by the Niedersächsische Sparkassenstiftung for the Niedersächsische Musiktage (2009)
- Yonah’s Dream for the Harry Partch Ensemble, commissioned by the Partch Institute (2008)
- RedDust Chamber Opera for soprano, mezzo soprano, baritone, chamber orchestra, surround-sound audio, and video, commissioned by Sequitur and Opera Theater of Pittsburgh (2007)
- Words/Echoes for solo percussion and pre-recorded audio, commissioned by Michael Lipsey (2005)
- Shadow Waltz for piano, commissioned by Eric Moe (2002)
- Under The Rainbow for flute and pre-recorded audio, commissioned by Patti Monson (2002)
- Möbius Loop for saxophone quartet and chamber orchestra, written for the Raschèr Saxophone Quartet (2000)
- 00Opinions for flute, clarinet, violin, piano/sampler, percussion, electric bass, and pre-recorded audio, commissioned by the Gould Center for Humanistic Studies (2000)
- Maggies for flute, clarinet, violin, cello, percussion, piano/sampler, commissioned by the Fromm Foundation (1997)
- Nü kuan tzu for soprano, mezzo soprano, and ten players, commissioned by the National Endowment for the Arts (1996)
- Ancient Eyes for flute, clarinet, cello, percussion, and two keyboards (one player) (1990)
- Circadian Rhythms for cello, percussion, and two keyboards (one player) (1989)
- Continental Drift for horn, percussion, and two keyboards (one player) (1987)
- Le Jon Ra for two celli (1981)
- Cascades for solo violin (1977/1980)
- Harp Quartet for alto flute/flute, bass clarinet/clarinet, viola, and harp (1978)

== Discography ==
- Lament/Witches’ Sabbath, Northern Flicker, Falling, Last Round (Ostatnia Runda). David Krakauer, Lisa Pegher, Boston Modern Orchestra Project, Gil Rose, conductor, Pittsburgh New Music Ensemble, Kevin Noe, conductor, Lindsay Kesselman, soprano, FLUX Quartet, Mantra Percussion. New Focus Recordings.
- Möbius Loop, Double Concerto, Sharpshooter. Boston Modern Orchestra Project, Gil Rose, conductor, Raschèr Saxophone Quartet. BMOP/sound.
- Yonah's Dream, Circadian Rhythms, Two Harmonies, Under The Rainbow, The Big Rip. Newband, Dave Eggar and Deoro, Wendy Richman, Tim Feeney, Shirley Yoo, Lindsey Goodman, Raschèr Saxophone Quartet, Calmus Ensemble. New World Records.
- Nü kuan tzu, Ancient Eyes, Maggies. Prism Players, Bradley Lubman, conductor, California E.A.R. Unit, Stephen Mosko, conductor. New World Records.
- Words/Echoes. Michael Lipsey, percussion. Capstone Records.
- Circadian Rhythms. Newband. Mode Records.
- Throat. Jean Kopperud, clarinet, Tom Kolor, percussion. Albany Records.
- Shadow Waltz. Eric Moe, piano. Albany Records.
- Under The Rainbow. Patti Monson, flutes. Albany Records.
- Continental Drift. Tom Varner, horn, Charles Descarfino, percussion, Loretta Goldberg, piano. Opus One Records
- Harp Quartet. Speculum Musicae, Donald Palma, conductor. Opus One Records.
- Möbius Loop. H2 Quartet. Blue Griffin Recording.
