= Annie Gosfield =

American classical composer

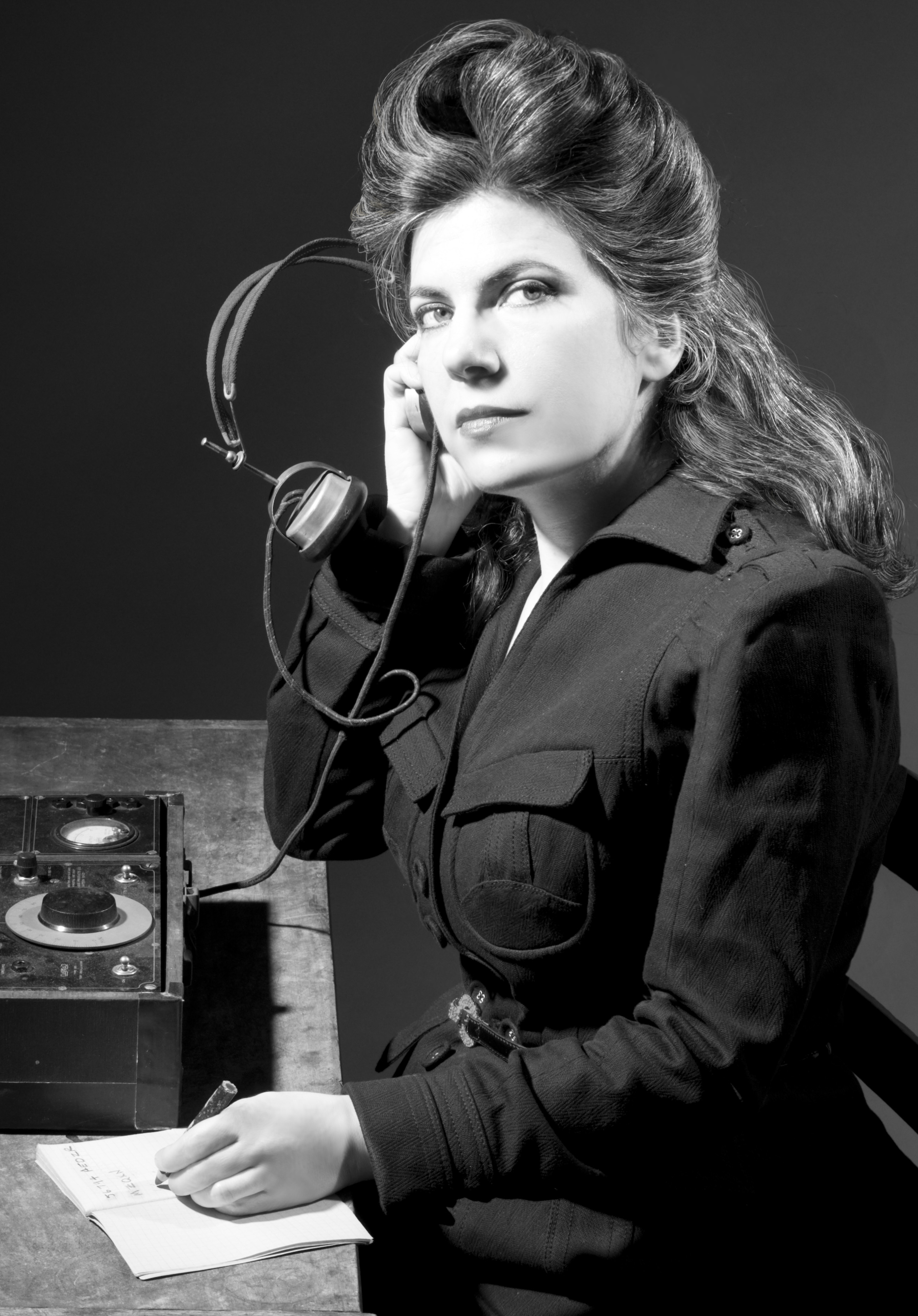
Annie Gosfield in 2018

Annie Gosfield (born September 11, 1960) is a New-York-based composer who works on the boundaries between notated and improvised music, electronic and acoustic sounds, refined timbres and noise. She composes for others and performs with her own group, taking her music to festivals, factories, clubs, art spaces and concert halls. Much of her work combines acoustic instruments with electronic sounds, incorporating unusual sources such as satellite sounds, machine sounds, detuned or out-of-tune samples and industrial noises. Her work often contains improvisation and frequently uses extended techniques and/or altered musical instruments. She won a 2012 Berlin Prize. She was born in Philadelphia.

== Work ==
Gosfield's work includes large-scale compositions, opera, orchestral work, chamber music, electronic music, video projects, and music for dance. She uses traditional notation, improvisation and extended techniques to explore relationships between music and noise. Her music is often inspired by non-musical sounds, such as machines, destroyed pianos, warped 78 rpm records, and detuned radios. She often collaborated with musicians to emphasize their unique qualities.

Gosfield's compositions have been performed internationally by The Bang on a Can Allstars, Agon Orchestra, Joan Jeanrenaud, Fred Frith, Felix Fan, Roger Kleier, Blair McMillen, William Winant, the FLUX Quartet, the Miami String Quartet, The Silesian String Quartet, So Percussion, Talujon Percussion, Newband (on the Harry Partch instruments) and many others, at festivals including Warsaw Autumn, ISCM World Music Days, Bang on a Can Marathon, Huddersfield Contemporary Music Festival, Santa Fe Chamber Music Festival, Festival Musique Actuelle, Wien Modern, OtherMinds, Spoleto Festival USA, Company Week, Taktlos, and three "Radical New Jewish Culture" festivals curated by John Zorn.

In November, 2017, The Los Angeles Philharmonic presented Gosfield's first opera, an original setting of Orson Welles's The War of the Worlds, adapted and directed by Yuval Sharon, simultaneously performed inside Walt Disney Concert Hall and on the streets of Los Angeles, using three repurposed air raid sirens to broadcast the music to the public in satellite performances in parking lots in Downtown Los Angeles.

Gosfield has composed a site-specific work for a factory in Germany, collaborated on installations with artist Manuel Ocampo, and created a video for an imaginary orchestra of destroyed instruments. She has worked with many choreographers, including Karole Armitage, Pam Tanowitz, and Susan Marshall. Her music for dance has been featured at the Venice Biennale, the Next Wave Festival at the Brooklyn Academy of Music (BAM), Teatro Olimpico (Rome), The Joyce Theater, Jacob's Pillow, and the Duke Theater on 42nd Street. Her uncle was actor Maurice Gosfield.

Her large-scale compositions include Daughters of the Industrial Revolution, a concert-length piece inspired by her grandparents’ immigrant experiences in New York City during the Industrial Revolution, commissioned by the MAP Fund and premiered at The Kitchen in 2011; the signature piece EWA7, a site-specific work created during a residency in the industrial environments of Nuremberg, Germany; and Floating Messages and Fading Frequencies, which incorporated coding systems used by the Resistance in WWII, conducted by Pierre-André Valade and performed by the Athelas Sinfonietta, with Gosfield's electronic trio in a four-city U.K. tour that included the 2011 Huddersfield Contemporary Music Festival.

Her work has been profiled in The New York Times, The New Yorker, on National Public Radio, and in articles in The Wire (magazine), Contemporary Music Review, Avant Magazine, Strings Magazine, MusikTexte, and in the book “Music and the Creative Spirit”. She received a 2008 Foundation for Contemporary Arts Grants to Artists Award, and has received recent fellowships from the McKnight Foundation, New York Foundation for the Arts, and the Siemens Foundation.

Her music is featured on four solo CDs on Tzadik Records. Her 2012 release, Almost Truths and Open Deceptions, features a chamber cello concerto, a piece for piano and broken shortwave radio, and compositions inspired by warped 78 rpm records, baseball, and the industrial revolution, performed by the Annie Gosfield Ensemble, Felix Fan, the Flux Quartet, Real Quiet, Blair McMillen, David Cossin, and the Pearls Before Swine Experience. Her third release, Lost Signals and Drifting Satellites, features work scored for solo violin accompanied by satellite transmissions, and solo and chamber works performed by Joan Jeanrenaud and the Flux Quartet. Her previous Tzadik CD, Flying Sparks and Heavy Machinery, features two pieces inspired by her 1999 residency in the factories of Nuremberg, Germany. Burnt Ivory and Loose Wires, her first solo release for Tzadik, focuses on her work for detuned piano.

Gosfield taught composition as a visiting lecturer at Columbia University from 2019 to 2021. She was the Milhaud Professor of composition at Mills College in 2003 and 2005, visiting lecturer at Princeton University in 2007, and a visiting artist at Cal Arts in 1999. She also taught composition at the University of Texas Austin in 2019 and Indiana University in 2022.

Gosfield's writing on music has been featured in four essays published by The New York Times' "TimeSelect", and her essay "Fiddling with Sputnik" was published in Arcana II, edited by John Zorn. She is a periodic contributor to "The Score", The New York Times blog where composers discuss their work and the issues involved in creating music in the 21st century.

== Honors and appointments ==
Gosfield received a 2021 Music Award from the Academy of Arts and Letters, and a 2017 Guggenheim Fellowship in music composition. She received the Berlin Prize in music composition, and was made a Fellow at the American Academy in Berlin in spring 2012. She was the Paul Fromm Composer-in-Residence at the American Academy in Rome in 2015 , and was a 2008 Civitella Ranieri Fellow.

== Discography ==
- Burnt Ivory and Loose Wires (1998). Music for detuned piano, saxophone quartet, and cello, performed by Gosfield's ensemble, Rova Saxophone Quartet, and Ted Mook.
- Flying Sparks and Heavy Machinery (2001). Two pieces inspired by a residency in the factories of Nuremberg: EWA7, performed by Gosfield's ensemble, and Flying Sparks and Heavy Machinery, performed by the Flux Quartet and Talujon Percussion.
- Lost Signals and Drifting Satellites (2004). Chamber and solo works performed by Joan Jeanrenaud, The Flux Quartet, and George Kentros.
- A Sideways Glance from an Electric Eye (2008). Appears on The Art of Virtual Rhythmicon with works by seven other composers (Innova Recordings).
- Almost Truths and Open Deceptions (2012). A chamber cello concerto, a piece for piano and broken shortwave radio, and compositions inspired by warped 78 RPM records, baseball, and the industrial revolution. Performed by the Annie Gosfield Ensemble, the Flux Quartet, Real Quiet, Blair McMillen, and the Pearls Before Swine Experience.
