= Eric Moe (composer) =

American composer

Eric Moe (born October 24, 1954) is an American composer and pianist. He has received awards from the American Academy of Arts and Letters the Koussevitzky Music Foundation and a Guggenheim Fellowship.

Moe was born in Durham, NC. He studied musical composition at Princeton University (BA) and at the University of California at Berkeley (MA, PhD). Currently, he is the Professor of Composition and Theory at the University of Pittsburgh where he co-directs the Music on the Edge new music concert series. At the University of Pennsylvania and Princeton University, he has held visiting professorships. Moe is also active as a concert pianist, having performed works by hundreds of composers, from John Cage and Anthony Davis to Stefan Wolpe. In 2003 Moe completed a 45-minute work for mezzo-soprano and ten players, setting a text of David Foster Wallace. Moe wrote about setting Wallace for Fiction Writers Review.

== Selected compositions ==
- Spirit Mountain for five players (2010)
- Strenuous Pleasures for six players (2010)
- Frozen Hours Melt Melodiously Into The Past for six players (2009)
- Jozaphine Freedom an entertainment on text of Denise Duhamel, for soprano, clarinet/bcl, piano/keyboard sampler (2009)
- Lavished Sunlight, Frozen Hours setting of Richard Wilbur for soprano, cello and piano (2009)
- Dead Cat Bounce for five players (2009)
- Kick & Ride (2008) Concerto for drum set and orchestra
- Grand Prismatic (2007) for clarinet and piano
- Gong Tormented solo percussion (2007)
- Heavenly Labials setting of Wallace Stevens for soprano, mezzo-soprano and piano (2007)
- Mud Wrestling at the O.K. Corral for cello and piano (2007)
- Superhero for six players (2006)
- I Have Only One Itching Desire for percussion sextet (2006)
- Market Forces saxophone quartet (2005)
- The Legend of the Sad Triad for solo piano (2005)
- Strange Exclaiming Music for violin and piano (2004)
- Preamble & Dreamsong from the 4-5 a.m. REM Stage for alto flute or viola and piano (2003)
- Tri-Stanfor mezzo-soprano and 10 players, text by David Foster Wallace (2003)
- Pulaski Skyway Waltz solo piano (2002)
- Eight Point Turn for eight players (2001)
- 3 Ways to Relieve Tension solo piano (2001)
- Repeat Offender for seven players (2000)
- Dead Elf Tugboat for flute and midi-keyboard (2000)
- Siren Songs for soprano and piano; also version with ensemble and version with chamber orchestra (1998)
- Fled Is That Music flute and piano (1998)
- And Life Like Froth Doth Throb for viola and cello (1997)
- Sonnets to Orpheus setting of Rilke for soprano, oboe, string quartet and piano (1997)
- Blue Air violin and piano (1996)
- Time Will Tell for five players (1996)
- No Time Like the Present for orchestra (1996) for the Pittsburgh Symphony Orchestra
- Kicking and Screaming concerto for piano and 10 players (1994)
- On the Tip of My Tongue bass clarinet and keyboard synthesizer (1993)
- We Happy Few piano trio (1990)
- riprap for four players (1989)
- Up & At 'Em for five players (1988) commissioned by the Koussevitzky Music Foundations

== Selected recordings ==
- Kick & Ride. Superhero, Eight Point Turn, Kick & Ride. Boston Modern Orchestra Project, Robert Schultz, soloist, Gil Rose conductor. BMOP/sound CD1021
- Strange Exclaiming Music. Curtis Macomber, violin; Stephen Gosling, piano; Michael Lipsey, percussion; New York Saxophone Quartet; Raschèr Saxophone Quartet; DoublePlay Percussion Duo; Columbus State University Percussion Ensemble/Paul Vaillancourt conductor. Naxos Records 8.559612.
- Tri-Stan. text of David Foster Wallace, Many Nessinger, mezzo-soprano, Sequitur, Paul Hostetter, conductor. Koch International Classics KIC-CD-7736
- Siren Songs, Sonnets to Orpheus, & A Warm Hello from the Alien Ant Farm. Christine Brandes, soprano, J. Karla Lemon, conductor, Jacqueline Leclair, oboe, Renee Jolles and Tom Chiu, violins, Toby Appel, viola, Fred Sherry, cello, Eric Moe, piano. Elizabeth Farnum, soprano, Rob Frankenberry, tenor. Albany Records TROY953
- The Waltz Project Revisited: New Waltzes for Piano. Eric Moe, piano. waltzes by Milton Babbitt, Hayes Biggs, Ronald Caltabiano, Anthony Cornicello, Akin Euba, Philip Glass, Ricky Ian Gordon, Lou Harrison, Robert Helps, Lee Hyla, Andrew Imbrie, Louis Karchin, Karl Kohn, Zygmunt Krauze, Eric Moe, Wayne Peterson, Mathew Rosenblum, Roger Sessions, Virgil Thomson, Joan Tower, Charles Wuorinen, and Roger Zahab. Albany Records TROY689
- Kicking and Screaming, Three Ways to Relieve Tension, Dead Elf Tugboat, Where Branched Thoughts Murmur in the Wind, Grande Etude Brilliante, Dance of the Honey Monkey, Nocturne, Fled Is That Music. Alex Karis, piano, Speculum Musicae, Donald Palma, conductor, Eric Moe, piano and midi keyboard, Rachel Rudich flutes. Albany Records TROY597
- Up & At 'Em: Chamber & Electroacoustic Music. Time Will Tell, Mouth Music, Blue Air, The Lone Cello, A Whirling and a Wandering Fire, Up & at 'em. Albany Records TROY506
