= New Music Ensemble =

New Music Ensemble may refer to:

- New Music Ensemble (California), founded by Larry Austin in 1972
- New Music Ensemble, Joel Marangella
- New Music Ensemble, Towson University
- New Music Ensemble, Singapore's Yong Siew Toh Conservatory of Music, Chan Tze Law
- Pittsburgh New Music Ensemble Kevin Noe
- New Music Ensemble, University of Texas, Arlington

== See also ==
- Psappha New Music Ensemble North West of England
- Cardboard Citizens New Music Ensemble experimental music group based in London
- New York New Music Ensemble (NYNME) contemporary music Pierrot ensemble. Since 1976
- Juventas New Music Ensemble
