= Paul Hostetter =

Paul Hostetter is an American conductor, the Ethel Foley Distinguished Chair in Orchestral Activities for the Schwob School of Music at Columbus State University, the conductor and artistic advisor for the Sequitur Ensemble, and the founder and artistic adviser to the Music Mondays chamber series in New York City. He has held appointments as the director of the John J. Cali School of Music at Montclair State University, where he also was the director of orchestral studies and associate professor, the music director of the Colonial Symphony, the music director of the High Mountain Symphony, artistic director of the Winter Sun Music Festival, music director of the New Jersey Youth Symphony, and tqq1he Associate Conductqq2or for the Broadway productions of Candide and George and Ira Gershwin's Fascinating Rhythm.

Hostetter has appeared as a guest conductor with the New Jersey Symphony Orchestra, the Orlando Philharmonic Orchestra, the American Composers Orchestra, the New York City Opera, Philharmonia Virtuosi, the Delaware Symphony Orchestra, the Opera Theatre of Pittsburgh, Peak Performances, the Genesis Opera Company, the Prism Chamber Orchestra, the New York Virtuosi, the Daylesford Sinfonia (Bermuda), the PAI Festival Orchestra (Kingston, PA), the Family Opera Initiative, the New York Concerti Sinfonietta, and the Stony Brook Summer Music Festival Orchestra, and has assisted with the Metropolitan Opera Chamber Ensemble. These performances have been reviewed in the NY Times, New Jersey Star Ledger, Daily Record, Bermuda Gazette, and Pittsburgh Tribune-Review.

He has premiered works by composers including David Del Tredici, Lewis Spratlan, and Ned Rorem with groups including the Washington Square Contemporary Music Society, Ensemble 21, the San Francisco Contemporary Music Players, Music from China, The Society for New Music, the Glass Farm Ensemble, and Philip Glass's Music at the Anthology series. He conducted Elliott Carter's Double Concerto at the Library of Congress as part of Mr. Carter's 100th-year celebration in December 2008, and in September 2009 he led Newband in the premiere of Dean Drummond’s opera Café Bufe with the Harry Partch Instruments.

He has collaborated with Jim Hall, Pat Metheny, and Joe Lovano, with strings from the Orchestra of St. Luke's, as well as with Heidi Grant Murphy and members of the Aureole Ensemble and Metropolitan Opera. His recording, Where Crows Gather, featuring the music of Lewis Spratlan, was listed by the New York Times chief critic Anthony Tommasini, and a recording of the music of Harold Meltzer was also named again by Tommasini. Hostetter's discography includes recordings on labels including Telarc, Koch, Mode, CRI, Albany, Tzadick, and Naxos, and his most recent recording of Concerti with the Sequitur Ensemble received five stars for performance from BBC Music Magazine.

He has led conducting workshops for the NY Philharmonic/NY Pops/ NY City Board of Education and has also led numerous orchestras including the NJ All-State and Florida All-State Orchestras. He is currently a visiting professor at Shanghai Normal University.

Hostetter performed as a percussionist/timpanist with the Orpheus Chamber Orchestra with whom he toured and recorded as well as with the American Symphony Orchestra and the New York Philharmonic. He has recorded for Argo, Decca, Delos, Deutsche Grammophon, Naxos, New World, PolyGram, Pro-Arte, RCA Victor, Sony Classical, and Warner Brothers, and has appeared on movie soundtracks and jingles, as well as over ten Broadway productions.

He holds degrees in performance from the Florida State University and the Juilliard School of Music and has appeared in master classes with Leonard Slatkin, Larry Rachleff, and Christopher Wilkins.

== Sources ==
- http://music.columbusstate.edu
- https://web.archive.org/web/20100627013803/http://www.sequitur.org/
- http://www.wyomingseminary.org
- http://www.cduniverse.com/classical.asp?conductor=Paul+Hostetter
