= Lisa Pegher =

American solo percussionist

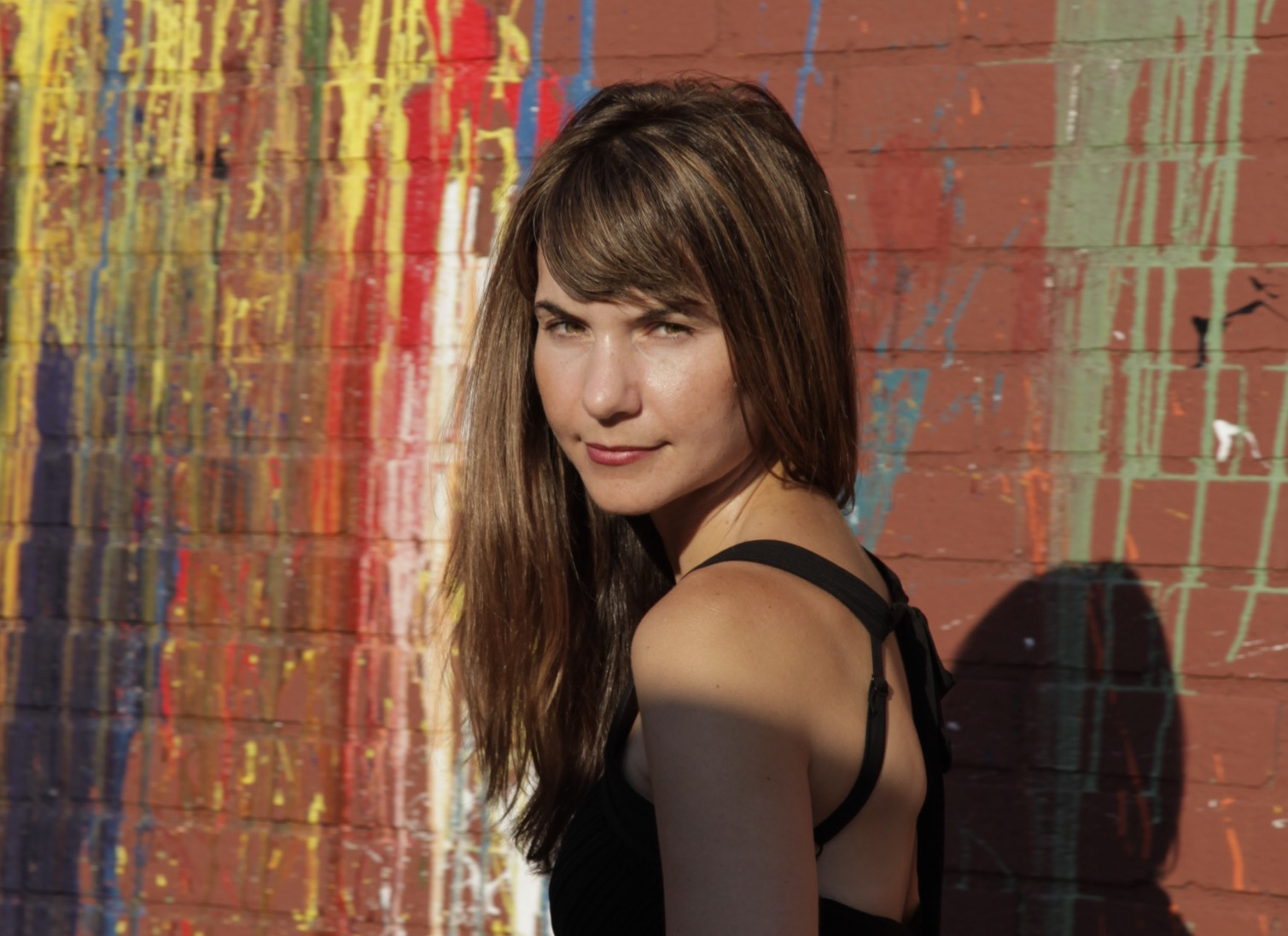

Background information
- Born: Pittsburgh, Pennsylvania, United States
- Genres: Classical, jazz, electronic
- Occupations: Percussionist, soloist, drummer
- Instruments: Percussion, drums
- Label: BMOP
- Website: www.lisapegher.com

Lisa Mae Pegher is an American drummer and solo percussionist. In her international career, she has performed throughout the world as a soloist, recitalist, and chamber musician.

== Background ==
Lisa Mae Pegher grew up in rural western Pennsylvania, close to Pittsburgh. Her grade school teacher encouraged her early development by volunteering to pay for her first drum. She studied music in Pittsburgh where she became a student of Jack DiIanni, a timpanist with the ballet and later studied with members of the Pittsburgh Symphony Orchestra. Pegher moved to Chicago to continue her studies at Northwestern University. She now lives in New York.

While in her early twenties, Pegher made her solo percussion debut with the Pittsburgh Symphony in 2001. She was the first percussionist to win concerto competitions at both of the universities she attended. In the United States, she has been helpful in making several competitions allow solo percussion as a category.

== Career ==
According to Symphony Magazine, Lisa Pegher is "blazing a particularly rocky, un-trodden trail" in the world of percussion. She has premiered numerous works for solo percussion that have been written especially for her including a New Music USA grant commission with composer David Stock premiering his Concerto for Percussion and Orchestra, Mathew Rosenblum's Double Concerto for Percussion and Saxophone with the Boston Modern Orchestra Project, saxophonist Kenneth Coon, conducted by Gil Rose. Brett William Dietz's Concerto for Percussion and Wind Symphony Richard Danielpour's "Wounded Healer" Percussion Concerto with the New Jersey Symphony Orchestra and Paul Dooley's "Circuits and Skins" Percussion concerto that explores mixing orchestral music with electronic dance music.

As a soloist, she has appeared across the globe in numerous venues and cities. She was one of two Americans chosen to compete at the TROMP International Percussion Competition in the Netherlands in 2007 and has been a featured artist at the Percussive Arts Society Convention on several occasions. She has appeared on many radio shows including on NPR's WGTE.

Prior to launching her full-time solo career, she performed regularly with the Baton Rouge Symphony Orchestra and as the principal timpanist for the Acadiana Symphony Orchestra.

Pegher has also fused elements of computer music, projection art and improvisation in a new multi-media show "Minimal Art", a collaboration with composer Andrew Knox and graphic designer Ben Hill that incorporates digital animation design, computer electronics and improvisation. The premiere performance was supplemented a dance company, "Of Moving Colors" on November 7, 2009. She founded her own trio in 2015 while living in Brooklyn, New York called the SideFire Trio. In 2024 she took digital media exploration further by creating a new multimedia show, The AI Rhythm Evolution Project aka AIRE, a combined effort with the ICEBERG NEW MUSIC composers collective in New York City that explores the evolution of percussion from its roots through the evolution of electronic music and eventual integration with artificial intelligence. It was premiered in 2024 at NYC's DiMenna Center for Classical Music.

== Discography ==
- "David Stock: Concertos" (2016) Boston Modern Orchestra Project
- "Mobiüs Loop" (2013) Boston Modern Orchestra Project
- "Paul Dooley: Masks and Machines" (2024) Boston Modern Orchestra Project
- "Minimal Art: Imaginary Windows" (2010)
- "Drunken Moon: The Pittsburgh New Music Ensemble" (2006)
- "Imperfection: Lisa Pegher and the SideFire Trio" (2017)
- "Paul Dooley: Masks and Machines" (2024)
- "David Stock: Concertos" (2016)
- "Mathew Rosenblum: Möbius Loop" (2013)

== Awards ==
- Aspen Music Scholarship awarded by the Minnesota Orchestra music competition recipient
- winner of the Vladimir R. Bakaleninkoff Memorial Fund Scholarship
- winner of Women’s Advisory Board Music competition at the Mary Pappert School of Music
- Director’s Prize at the Kingsville (Texas) International Music Competition
- recipient of the international YAMAHA Young Performing Artist Award.
- William J. Spencer award fund at Northwestern University
- first place honors at the Northwestern University Concerto/Aria competition
