= BMOP =

BMOP may refer to:

- British Mandate of Palestine, a League of Nations mandate in what is now Israel, Jordan, and the Palestinian territories
- Boston Modern Orchestra Project, a professional orchestra in Boston, Massachusetts, USA
