= Andrés Cárdenes =

Cuban and American musician

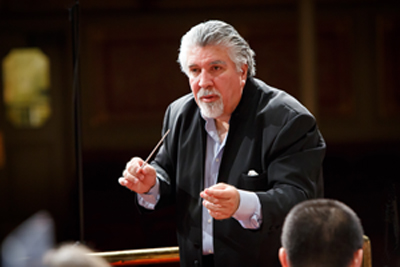
Cárdenes conducting the Carnegie Mellon Philharmonic

Andrés Cárdenes is a Cuban and American violinist, pedagogue, conductor, violist, recording artist and concertmaster. He has performed and taught in a number of prominent positions, including his current professorship in violin at Lynn Conservatory in Boca Raton, Florida, and formerly at Carnegie Mellon University School of Music, where he held the Dorothy Richard Starling & Alexander Speyer Jr. Endowed Chair. He was also the artistic and music director of the Carnegie Mellon University Philharmonic,

== Career ==
At the age of 15, Cárdenes began his studies of conducting under Thor Johnson. His pedagogical career started when he became an assistant to his teacher and mentor Josef Gingold at Indiana University Jacobs School of Music. He also trained under conductor Bryan Balkwill. Overall, Cárdenes has spent over 30 years as a professional musician. During that time he has appeared with over 100 orchestras across the world in locations such as Moscow, Pittsburgh, San Francisco, Houston, Helsinki, Caracas, Brussels, and Shanghai. In 1982, he tied for 3rd Prize at the International Tchaikovsky Competition, which helped launched his global career. He is also noted as frequent collaborative musician, having worked with conductors such as Lorin Maazel, Mariss Jansons, Sir André Previn, Leonard Slatkin, Gerard Schwarz, and others.

Cárdenes has been concertmaster at notable orchestras, including the San Diego Symphony, Utah Symphony, and Pittsburgh Symphony Orchestra. As a conductor and concertmaster, Cárdenes led the Pittsburgh Symphony Orchestra for over 20 years, leaving in 2010. The Pittsburgh Symphony Chamber Orchestra was created in 1999 for Cárdenes to showcase his talents as a conductor and violinist and it went on to perform for a total of eleven seasons. Cárdenes is known for premiering rarely heard pieces by notable composers. He champions contemporary composers and their works, having commissioned a number of modern works from André Previn, Leonardo Balada, Edgar Meyer, Rodion Shchedrin, Mariana Villanueva, and many more. He gave the world premières of pieces such as David Stock's Violin Concerto and Roberto Sierra's Evocacíones, both with the Pittsburgh Symphony.

Cárdenes is a very active teacher. He was appointed to the faculty of Indiana University in 1979 and has given master classes at nearly all of the top music institutions in the United States. He was head of the string department at Carnegie Mellon University for 20 years. and has served on the faculties of Indiana University, the University of Utah, and University of Michigan. Cardenes was also a guest artist in residence at the University of Colorado at Boulder for two years, until 2012. Cárdenes is a proponent for the Franco-Belgian School of Violin Playing.

In his other activities, Cárdenes has toured with The Chamber Music Society of Lincoln Center, is a member of the Carnegie Mellon Piano Trio, and was appointed violinist of the Diaz Trio, which holds a summer residence at the Brevard Music Center. He has recorded on multiple labels including Naxos, RCA, Ocean Records, Delos Recordings, Artek, Melodiya and Sony. Cárdenes has also contributed personally edited scores to the Internet publisher Ovation Press.
