= Lansing Symphony Orchestra =

Musical organization

The Lansing Symphony Orchestra (LSO) is an American symphony orchestra headquartered in Lansing, Michigan. It was founded in 1929 under the leadership of its first music director, Izler Solomon. Since 2006, the orchestra has been headed by music director Timothy Muffitt.

== History ==
The LSO presents a wide variety of orchestral programming throughout its seasons.

MasterWorks and Pops concerts are performed at the Wharton Center for the Performing Arts on the campus of Michigan State University. Chamber concerts are performed at Plymouth Congregational Church in Lansing. Big Band concerts are performed at Dart Auditorium on the campus of Lansing Community College.

Music Directors & Conductors

1929-1936 Izler Solomon
1936-1939 Marius Fossenkemper
1939-1941 Pedro Paz
1941-1962 Romeo Tata
1962-1964 Gregory Millar
1964-1967 Hugo Vianello
1967-1978 A. Clyde Roller
1978 Gustav Meier, Max Bragado-Darman, Larynx Palomo
1979-2006 Gustav Meier
2006–present Timothy Muffitt
