= Baton Rouge Symphony Orchestra =

Orchestra in Louisiana

The Baton Rouge Symphony Orchestra, founded in 1947, is an orchestra located in Baton Rouge, Louisiana, United States. The orchestra performs at the Theater for Performing Arts in the Baton Rouge River Center.

In 1940, a group of women formed a string quartet, playing "Fair" in their pajamas in their own homes. Soon after that their long-term dream of being able to have a symphony facilitated the needs of the public, and they were able to organize an orchestra as a service to the local community. After several years of work, the new Baton Rouge Symphony was received Orchestra and Civic giving it meaning to a department, and gave its first performance on February 5, 1947, in the Baton Rouge High School Auditorium.

== History ==
Initially, the orchestra consisted of 60 musicians from Baton Rouge, New Orleans, Southeastern Louisiana Institute in Hammond, and Southwestern Louisiana Institute (now ULL) in Lafayette. Frederick Kopp conducted the first concert. Three concerts were held during the season, and the first soloist to appear with the orchestra was violinist Miriam Solovieff. The season closed with a performance of the Redemption by Charles Gounod.

=== 1940s ===
In the 1948-49 season, four concerts were presented by the orchestra's new conductor, David Forrester. A newly established chamber recital series, sponsored by the orchestra, was inaugurated with two world-famous soloists, Mischa Elman, violin, and Amparo Iturbi, piano. A highlight of the 1949-50 season was the appearance of the Baton Rouge Boys Choir, conducted by Carver Blanchard. Another development was the inauguration of a children's series designed to introduce music to Baton Rouge youth by having the orchestra perform in the schools.

The orchestra had a new conductor, Orlando Barera, who resigned as assistant conductor of the Houston Symphony to come to Baton Rouge.

=== 1950s ===
The 1950-51 season was extended to include six subscription concerts, in addition to the youth concerts and the chamber recital series, with Amparo and José Iturbi as recitalists. The board of directors re-elected Dr. Cecil Lorio as president, and voted Bobby Lorio as permanent honorary president of the Baton Rouge Civic Symphony Association. Conductor Richard Korn replaced Alfredo Antonini, who could not honor his new contract because of his responsibilities as music director of CBS in New York.

Several years after its inception, the orchestra appointed its first long-term conductor. Maestro Emil Cooper, who had retired as conductor of the Metropolitan Opera Orchestra in New York City, was hired at the beginning of the 1951-52 season. Cooper remained as conductor of the Baton Rouge Civic Symphony through the 1959-60 season. That same season the orchestra moved to the new Lee High School Auditorium. He was to lead the orchestra in the 1960-61 season, but became ill and was unable to conduct the first concert.

=== 1960s ===
Dr. Peter Paul Fuchs, a native of Vienna, Austria, and professor of conducting at Louisiana State University, was engaged to conduct the opening concert on October 19, 1960, to fill in for the ailing Maestro Cooper. Cooper informed the association that he was too ill to return for the second concert on November 16, which was then also conducted by Dr. Fuchs. On that very evening Maestro Cooper died in Roosevelt Hospital in New York. Fuchs was contracted to finish the season.

Fuchs was engaged as the permanent conductor for the 1961-62 season, a position he held until his retirement from LSU in the spring of 1976.

When the new theater was opened in the LSU Union in 1964, the orchestra moved its performances to that facility. The new hall afforded audiences comfortable seating, air-conditioning and better acoustics.

=== 1970s ===
During the decade, the orchestra changed its name to the Baton Rouge Symphony Orchestra. The size and quality of the orchestra had grown to that of a metropolitan class group, and international soloists were again being brought in to perform. A professional manager and staff were added to the budget of the association. The decade concluded with the 1979-80 season with the orchestra having its own home in the new Centroplex Theater for the Performing Arts in downtown Baton Rouge.

The orchestra hired James Yestadt, LSU professor of music, to conduct the 1976-77 season. Yestadt remained in this position until his retirement at the conclusion of the 1981-82 season. The season expanded to seven subscription concerts, and the orchestra began playing concerts in surrounding towns and communities. During these years, the Louisiana Youth Orchestra was formed. The Baton Rouge Choral Society, formed by Victor Klimash, performed on numerous occasions with the BRSO. This organization, now conducted by Dr. Kenneth Fulton, officially became the Baton Rouge Symphony Chorus.

=== 1980s ===
James Paul, assistant conductor of the Milwaukee Symphony Orchestra, became the new conductor of the Baton Rouge Symphony Orchestra for the 1981-82 season. On October 22, 1988, the orchestra performed at Carnegie Hall in New York City. Guest artist Abbey Simon joined the orchestra for a performance of Beethoven's Piano Concerto No. 4. The program included Chadwick's Jubilee from Symphonic Sketches and Sibelius’ Symphony No. 2. The orchestra received excellent reviews in New York newspapers, as well as the Morning Advocate and State-Times. Also rewarding was the full house in attendance, of which only a small percentage was from Baton Rouge. The Baton Rouge Symphony Orchestra had arrived.

In the early 1980s the BRSO held several seasons of pops concerts in the Centroplex Coliseum conducted by James Yestadt. These indoor concerts, offering a lighter fare for early summer listening, featured such artists as Jimmie Davis, Pete Fountain, Chet Atkins and Gordon MacRae.

The first "Friday Night Live at the Pops" concert was December 23, 1989. A near capacity crowd braved cold weather to hear the orchestra in a program of Christmas favorites. The concert was conducted by Victor Klimash and featured the Baton Rouge Symphony Chorus. The Holiday Pops concerts have become very successful.

=== 1990s ===
Additional growth took place in the 1990s. The Pops series grew to four pairs of concerts during the regular concert season and five outdoor Summerfest concerts during the early summer months performed at the Hemingbough Conference Center near St. Francisville. For the 2001–02 season the Pops and Summerfest series were combined to create the Summerfest Pops series—a lengthened season of concerts on the grounds of Hemingbough. The series was later retired in 2003.

In August 1993, the Baton Rouge Symphony Association changed its name to the Louisiana Symphony Association, laying the groundwork for possible future expansion. The Baton Rouge Symphony Orchestra retained its name. The association purchased its own office building on Brookline Avenue as its permanent headquarters. In June 1998 James Paul announced his retirement as musical director and conductor.

During the Baton Rouge Symphony Orchestra's 50th anniversary season, six talented candidates competed for the opportunity to become the maestro to lead the organization into the next century. In May 1999, Timothy Muffitt was selected as the new music director.

=== Since 2000 ===
In August 2002 the BRSO sold its office building on Brookline Avenue and relocated twice before settling into its current location in February 2005 within the Shaw Center for the Arts building in downtown Baton Rouge. This is where the BRSO helped house the Louisiana Philharmonic Orchestra administration from August 2005 till June 2006 following the aftermath of Hurricane Katrina, after which the LPO was able to return to its offices in New Orleans.

In its 2006-07 season, the orchestra performed over 60 concerts in ten venues across the state of Louisiana, including a performance of Handel's Messiah at the downtown First Baptist Church, the Barbecue of Seville family picnic and concert at the Baton Rouge Community College's Magnolia Performing Arts Pavilion, and the expansion of the Chamber Series into the Manship Theater and St. Joseph's Cathedral in downtown Baton Rouge, as well as venues in St. Francisville, Plaquemine and Slidell.

== Music Directors ==
- David Forrester (1948 - 1949)
- Orlando Barera (1949 - 1950)
- Richard Korn (1950 - 1951)
- Emil Cooper (1951 - 1960)
- Peter Paul Fuchs (1960 - 1976)
- James Yestadt (1976 - 1982)
- James Paul (1982 - 1998)
- Timothy Muffitt (1999 – 2019)
- Adam Johnson (2024 - present)

== The Louisiana Youth Orchestras ==
The Louisiana Youth Orchestras are youth performing arts organizations in the capitol area. It is an educational component of the Baton Rouge Symphony Orchestra and a project of the Baton Rouge Symphony League. The LYO mission is to enhance music education in the schools and promote the highest standards of orchestral performance.

The Louisiana Youth Orchestra debuted on February 26, 1984. Today, nearly 180 musicians between the ages of 6 and 20 are selected by competitive audition to present three major concerts at the Baton Rouge Community College Magnolia Performing Arts Pavilion. These musicians are representatives of public, private, and parochial schools from 25 districts in a four-parish area.

David Torns was named music director of the LYO program in May 2003 and conducts the Louisiana Youth Orchestra. The Louisiana Junior Youth Orchestra is under the direction of Jessica Schwartz and consists of middle school level musicians. The Louisiana Junior String Ensemble is intended for elementary school level musicians and is conducted by Lisa McGibney. Both groups were established in 1990.

The newest addition to the program is the Louisiana Youth Orchestra Percussion Ensemble founded by Dr. Michael Kingan in 2000. The LYOPE performs challenging repertoire for advanced high school percussionists. It is under the direction of Lisa Pegher.

Performances have been given at LSU, Baton Rouge High Magnet School, Lee High School, Scotlandville Magnet High School, University Laboratory School, New Orleans, and St. Francisville. The 2004-05 LYO season was highlighted by a tour to the Walt Disney World Resort where they performed at the Galaxy Palace Theater in front of an international audience. The LJSE was featured at the 2004 inauguration of Governor Blanco. The Louisiana Youth Orchestra is one of many youth arts organizations to perform at the downtown Christmas Tree Lighting. They also performed at the opening of "The Symphony of Trees" at the Argosy Atrium in December 1999 - 2001.

The May 2000 concert of the Louisiana Youth Orchestras was broadcast on Metro21, a government-access television channel. In October 2000, they performed at the Groundbreaking Ceremony of the Irene W. Pennington Planetarium and ExxonMobil Space Theater at the Louisiana Art and Science Museum. The LYO performed with the Baton Rouge Symphony for the 1998 Holiday Pops concert, and in June 1998, the LYO represented the state of Louisiana for the National Festival of the States. Performance venues included the U.S. Naval Memorial, the Jefferson Memorial, and the Old Post Office Pavilion. The LYO has also performed on the grounds of the Old State Capitol in October 1997 for delegates attending "Louisiana's Promise: The Summit on Youth."

The orchestras of the LYO have been featured in segments of WLPB's Gumbo Island and Louisiana Legends.

Rehearsals are held at the LSU School of Music on Monday evenings, September through May. The concert season also features the winners of the annual LYO Concerto Competition and the Baton Rouge Music Teachers Association Piano Concerto Competition.
