= Roger Kleier =

Roger Kleier (born 1958, Glendale, California) is an American composer, guitarist, improviser, and producer.

He studied composition at the University of North Texas College of Music and the USC Thornton School of Music. Kleier's compositional work typically uses an expanded vocabulary for the electric guitar through the use of extended techniques and digital technology. His style draws equally from improvisation, contemporary classical music, and the American guitar traditions of blues, jazz, and rock.

Kleier has been a guest lecturer and educator at the California Institute of the Arts, the Academy of Performing Arts in Prague, Washington University in St. Louis, Edith Cowan University, Hartt College of Music, San Francisco State University, Mills College, St. Cloud University, and Princeton University. He has received grants from the National Endowment for the Arts, the Rockefeller Foundation, the American Composers Forum, the McKnight Foundation, and Meet the Composer. Residencies include the Djerassi Foundation, the American Academy in Berlin, a McKnight Visiting Composer Fellowship (Minnesota), a Harvestworks Fellowship, an Engine 27 Project Residency, the Gerald Oshita Fellowship, and he was the Composer-in-Residence of the Center for Contemporary Music at Mills College.

Featured performances of Kleier's include Warsaw Autumn Poland, the Tampere Jazz Festival Finland, the Schleswig Holstein Festival Hamburg, the Huddersfield Contemporary Music Festival, Jazz au Fil de L'eau Parthenay, the Athelas New Music Festival Copenhagen, MaerzMusik Berlin, the Ring Ring Festival Belgrade, the Santa Fe Chamber Music Festival, Rock and a Hard Place Festival Mills College Oakland, the Salvador Dalí Museum St. Petersburg, Festival Musique Actuelle Victoriaville, Mesto Zensk Ljubljana, Der Weimarhalle Weimar, New Music Marathon Prague, Taktlos Festival Switzerland, the Anchorage NYC, the Audio Art Festival Cracow, the Totally Huge New Music Festival Perth, the Kitchen NYC, Moving Sounds Festival NYC, Symphony Space NYC, and Bang On A Can Festival at Lincoln Center NYC.

Kleier lives in New York City. His three solo CDs are "KlangenBang", released on the Rift label; "Deep Night, Deep Autumn" released by the Starkland label; and "The Night Has Many Hours" on the Innova label. He has performed and/or recorded with Annie Gosfield, Marc Ribot's Shrek, Elliott Sharp, Fred Frith, Joan Jeanrenaud, Ikue Mori, Carl Stone, Laurie Anderson, Phill Niblock, Alan Licht, David Moss, Hahn Rowe, Chris Cutler, David Krakauer, Chris Brown, Zeitgeist, Relâche, Agon Orchestra, William Winant, Zeena Parkins, Stan Ridgway, Trevor Dunn, Ches Smith, and others.
