= Timothy Muffitt =

American conductor (born 1961)

Timothy Wellington Muffitt
- Born: 1961 (age 64–65); Bridgeport, Connecticut
- Occupation: Conductor

Timothy Wellington Muffitt (born 1961) is an American conductor.

== Biography ==
Timothy Muffitt was born in Bridgeport, Connecticut, and began playing the piano at the age of seven, later adding viola and trumpet. He studied music at the Eastman School of Music, training in orchestral direction under the guidance of David Effron, earning a degree in Doctor of Musical Arts.

=== Education ===
Muffitt completed his undergraduate and masters studies at the Ohio State University, receiving his Master of Arts in 1986. His thesis was titled "The first symphony of Charles Ives : a historical and analytical survey"

He received his doctoral degree (DMA) from the Eastman School of Music in 1995, studying under David Effron, Timothy Russell, Murry Sidlin and Walter Hendl. His dissertation was titled "Programming philosophies and innovations of select professional orchestra conductors".

== Musical career ==
Muffitt has been the music director and conductor of the Baton Rouge Symphony Orchestra since 1999, as well as music director and conductor of the Lansing Symphony Orchestra since 2006.

In the past, Muffitt was the associate conductor of the Austin Symphony Orchestra and the artistic director of the Louisiana Philharmonic Orchestra of New Orleans in relation to the Casual Classics Series.

In addition to his work with professional orchestras, Muffitt is also the artistic director of the Chautauqua Institution Music School and the conductor of the Chautauqua's Music School Festival Orchestra, one of the best orchestral groups in the country.

He also appears with other major orchestras throughout the country, including the Saint Louis Symphony, the Tulsa Symphony, the San Francisco Symphony and the Long Beach Symphony. He also recently debuted at the Hollywood Bowl.

Other Muffitt collaborations have been with the symphony orchestras of Houston, Phoenix, Edmonton and Spokane, with the Pro Musica Chamber Orchestra of Columbus Ohio, the Buffalo Philharmonic, the Virginia Symphony, the Grant Park Music Festival Orchestra of Chicago and the Harrisburg Symphony Orchestra.

He has worked with important artists such as Yo-Yo Ma, Renee Fleming, Dame Kiri Te Kanawa, Andre Watts, Alicia de Larrocha, Pinchas Zukerman, Van Cliburn, Lynn Harrell, Itzhak Perlman and the composers John Cage, Joseph Schwantner, Ellen Taffe Zwilich, John Harbison, Joan Tower and Bernard Rands among others.

In January 2019 the Baton Rouge Symphony Orchestra announced that Timothy Muffitt will leave his position next year. Muffitt will conduct the orchestra until the 2019–20 season, his twentieth season with the organization, and will therefore be appointed Laureate Music Director.

In February 2025 the Lansing Symphony Orchestra announced that Maestro Muffitt would be retiring at the end of the 2025-26 season, the LSO's 96th, after serving as the music director and conductor for 20 years. He will remain involved as an artistic advisor for the following season.
