= Sensations of Tone =

Music book

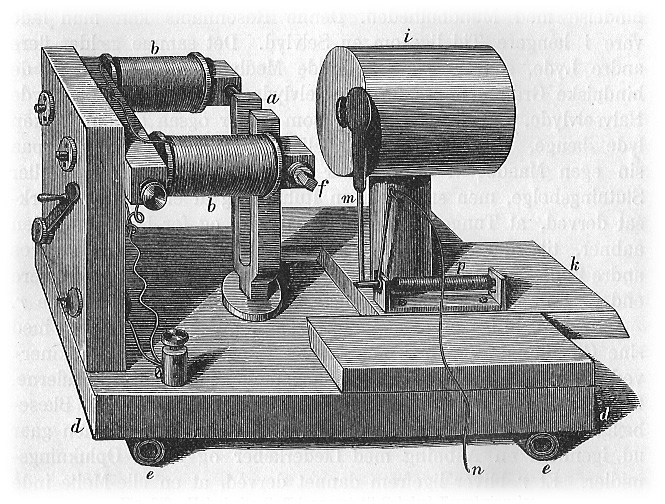
Helmholtz resonator, p. 121, fig. 32

On the Sensations of Tone as a Physiological Basis for the Theory of Music (German Die Lehre von den Tonempfindungen als physiologische Grundlage für die Theorie der Musik), commonly referred to as Sensations of Tone, is a foundational work on music acoustics and the perception of sound by Hermann von Helmholtz.

The first German edition was published in 1863. The English translation by Alexander J. Ellis was first published in 1875 (the first English edition was from the 1870 third German edition; the second English edition from the 1877 fourth German edition was published in 1885; the 1895 and 1912 third and fourth English editions were reprints of the second edition). The editions translated into English contain detailed commentary and notes (titled "Additions by the Translator") by Ellis.

Helmholtz declared that he started working on his book in 1854, which concluded in 1862.

Helmholtz started publishing on acoustics in 1852. His last article on acoustics was in 1878, reviewing the book by Lord Rayleigh (Theory of Sound). Therefore, Helmholtz published articles/books and gave lectures on acoustics for at least 24 years.
