= Kevin Noe =

American classical composer

Kevin Patrick Noe (born January 7, 1969, in Dallas, Texas) is an American conductor, stage director, writer, and trumpeter. He is currently the executive artistic director of the Pittsburgh New Music Ensemble, and a regular guest conductor of orchestra, opera, and ballet at Indiana University's Jacobs School of Music

== Growing up ==
Noe began music lessons at the age of 5. He moved frequently during his youth, eventually settling in Frankfort, Kentucky, in 1984 where he attended high school. He became increasingly serious about his musical studies, and also began competing in various musical competitions. He experimented with composition, and soon found a new passion for conducting as a result of programs in his school and his contact in 1987 with Larry Rachleff. During this time, in addition to performing in orchestras, bands, jazz bands, and choirs, he began performing as an actor in numerous productions in the Frankfort Youth Theatre and other youth theatre programs, and in school. He also began competing and winning prizes as an actor in state competitions in performances of scenes from various works including Edward Albee's Who's Afraid of Virginia Woolf? and Peter Shaffer's Equus.

== Post secondary academic education ==
He began his undergraduate studies in music performance at the University of North Texas College of Music in 1987, where he performed in various ensembles, the jazz band, and as a conductor. While an undergraduate student in performance, he became increasingly involved with conducting and was invited to student conduct the University of North Texas Symphony Orchestra in a performance while he was still in school. In September 1992, Noe performed as a soloist with the College of Music Symphony Orchestra as one of five winners of the Annual Concerto Competition.

In 1990, Noe moved to London, England, where he enrolled in music studies at the University of Surrey, as a part of a foreign exchange program. While in England, he performed in various ensembles, performed as a soloist with the university orchestra, and continued his conducting studies. He spent considerable time cultivating new passions for both opera – through dozens of performances he attended at the English National Opera, and New Music as well as continuing his passion for the theatre. He also began a lifelong affinity for the study of the aesthetics of theatre after committing considerable time to the study of the history of opera and opera's aesthetics from the Florentine Camerata to the present.

After his return to the United States, he enrolled in graduate studies in 1992 at the Shepherd School of Music at Rice University in Houston as a student of Larry Rachleff, with whom he had first developed his love of conducting. While in attendance he served as the music director of the Campanile Orchestra, and he regularly conducted and performed with both the university Symphony and Chamber orchestras and was awarded the Sally Shepherd Prize in music for his work at the school. In 1993, he attended the Schweitzer Institute as a student of conducting with Gunther Schuller.

In 1994, he was awarded the Maurice Abravanel fellowship as a conducting fellow at the Tanglewood Institute. While in attendance at Tanglewood, he studied with Gustav Meier, Seiji Ozawa, and Robert Spano. He was invited to conduct the Tanglewood Fellowship Orchestra in a performance of Act III of Puccini's La Bohème.

== Post-college professional posts ==
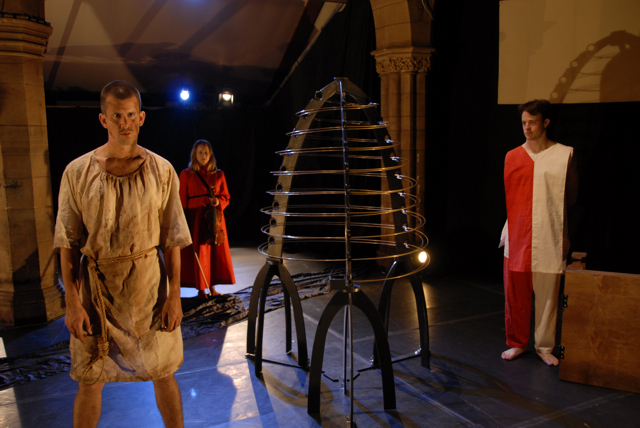
Just Out of Reach, Edinburgh Fringe Festival (2008 photo)

1996–2000: Noe served as the music director of the Orchestras at Duquesne University, in Pittsburgh, Pennsylvania. He also served as a regular conductor for the Pittsburgh Opera Center in various productions including Samuel Barber's Vanessa, and Igor Stravinsky's The Rake's Progress, and taught undergraduate conducting. In 1998, he served as the conductor of the university New Music Ensemble. He also served on several occasions as a cover conductor with the Pittsburgh Symphony Orchestra.

1997: Noe accepted a post as the Associate Conductor of the National Repertory Orchestra, in Breckenridge, Colorado.

2000–2005: Noe served as the music director of the orchestras and assistant professor of music at The University of Texas at Austin and began teaching conducting for select graduate and doctoral level conducting students. In 2003, he served as co-host for the radio show Knowing the Score, a program showcasing new works of concert music and offering commentary intended to help audiences listen to and enjoy newly composed works more easily.

=== Pittsburgh New Music Ensemble ===
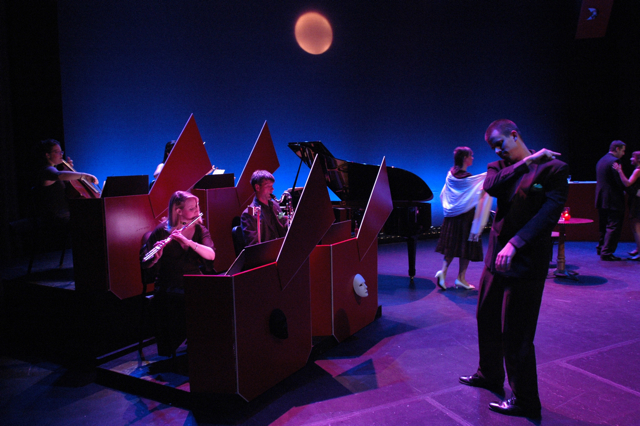
The Pittsburgh New Music Ensemble, Drunken Moon, Kieren MacMillan (composer), Kevin Noe (director & conductor)

2000–present: Noe is the artistic director and conductor of the Pittsburgh New Music Ensemble, a professional ensemble founded in 1976 by composer David Stock. Noe took the ensemble in a new direction combining his interests in both music and theatre and developed a presentation style for the group now known as "Theatre of Music." Since that time, audience attendance at performances has risen dramatically. The group has commissioned and premiered well over 200 works in its history, and over 45 during Noe's tenure with the ensemble. The group has recorded five albums since 2004, including "Drunken Moon" available currently on the Lime Green Records label, and Against the Emptiness – available in 2009 on the New Dynamic Records label. The group has now been listed five years in a row as having given one of the top ten performances in the city of Pittsburgh by the Pittsburgh Post-Gazette for the year. In the summer of 2008, the group presented the world premiere of a new multi-disciplinary work Noe co-wrote with his friend Kieren MacMillan called Just Out of Reach to critical acclaim. The work was subsequently taken on tour to Edinburgh, Scotland where it was nominated by the press for a Total Theatre Award at the Edinburgh Festival Fringe.
