= Mariana Villanueva =

Mexican music educator and composer (born 1964)

Mariana Villanueva (born Mexico City, 1964) is a Mexican music educator and composer.

== Biography ==
She began her musical studies at National Conservatory in México City, studying under Mario Lavista, Federico Ibarra, Julio Estrada and Daniel Catán and continued her preparation at Carnegie Mellon University, under Leonardo Balada and Lucas Foss, where she received her Bachelors (1992) and Masters (1995) degrees in Music Composition. Since 1987, her works have been performed in Mexico, and occasionally in The United States (New York, New Mexico Indiana, and Pittsburgh) by the Pittsburgh New Music Ensemble, Carnegie Mellon Trio and The New Mexico String Quartet. In Europe her music has heard in Spain, Germany, Switzerland and Sweden.

Mariana Villanueva has received the John Simon Guggenheim Memorial Foundation Award (1999); The MEXICO/USA Rockefeller, FONCA/BANCOMER Prize (1995, 1996); and some other rewards from FONCA (1993, 1997) and Carnegie Mellon University. She has been written works for the Carnegie Mellon Trio (1993), The Pittsburgh New Music Ensemble (1996); and The Ensamble Cosmopolitano of Berlín (2002). She also has collaborated for the Carnegie Mellon Drama Department under the direction of stage directors Rina Yerushalmi (La casa de Bernarda Alba, 1990) and Yossy Israeli (Antigone, 1991), and in Mexico for The Ballet del Teatro del Espacio with Gladiola Orozco (El Gran Viaje, 1997).

As a complement for her creative search, Villanueva completed a Ph.D. degree in Music History (Mexico City, UAM-I, 2004) in relation with musical archetypes in the case of the Cuban composer Julian Orbón. Currently she teaches music composition at the Centro Morelense de las Artes in Cuernavca, Morelos.

== Works ==
Villanueva has composed for solo instruments, musical theater, chamber ensemble and symphony orchestra. Selected works include:

- Cantar de un alma ausente for solo clarinet (1986)
- Antigone mezzo-soprano, tenor, bass, chorus and piano (1991)
- Anabacoa for symphony orchestra (1992)
- Lamentations for violin, cello and piano (1993)
- Ritual For orchestra. (1993)
- Santo Luzbel for bass and orchestra (1994)
- Anamnesis for clarinet and string quartet (1996)
- El jardín del sol (1997)
- Ishtar For soprano and prepared piano. (1999)
- Made of clay and breath for soprano, horn in F, viola and harp (2002)
- Medea for solo viola (2009)
- Taliesin for violin and orchestra (2003)

Her work has been recorded and issued on CD, including:

- Clarinete Solo: México Vol. 2, Javier Vinasco, Cero Records, 2009
