= Lee Hyla =

American composer

Lee Hyla (August 31, 1952 – June 6, 2014) was an American classical music composer from Niagara Falls, New York. He received the Stoeger Prize from the Chamber Music Society of Lincoln Center, a Guggenheim Fellowship, two National Endowment for the Arts fellowships, the Goddard Lieberson Award from the American Academy of Arts and Letters, the St. Botolph Club Award, and the Rome Prize. He taught at New England Conservatory from 1992 to 2007, serving as co-chair of the composition department for most of that time. In 2007, he was appointed the chair of music composition at Northwestern University's Bienen School of Music. His music has been recorded on CRI, New World Records, Tzadik Records, and the Boston Modern Orchestra Project's label BMOP Sound.

He was best known for the Violin Concerto, Prepulse Suspended and Concerto for Piano No. 2.

Hyla died in Chicago in 2014 at the age of 61.
