= Harry Partch =

American composer (1901–1974)

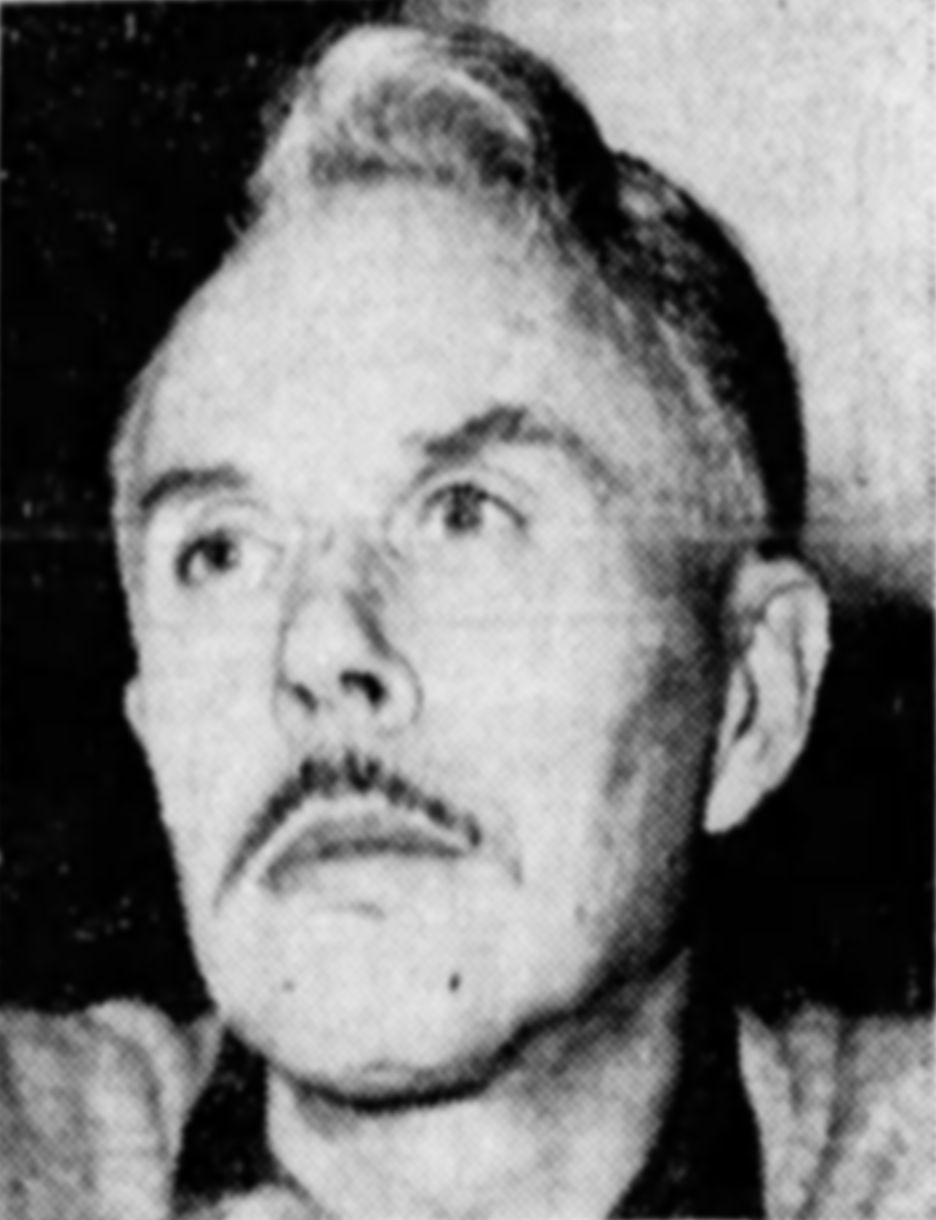
- c. 1952
- Born: June 24, 1901; Oakland, California, U.S.
- Died: September 3, 1974 (aged 73); Encinitas, California, U.S.
- Occupations: Composer; writer; pianist; publisher; teacher
- Relatives: Virgil Partch (cousin)

Harry Partch (June 24, 1901 – September 3, 1974) was an American composer, music theorist, and creator of unique musical instruments. He composed using scales of unequal intervals in just intonation, and was one of the first 20th-century composers in the West to work systematically with microtonal scales, alongside Lou Harrison. He built his own instruments in these tunings on which to play his compositions, and described the method behind his theory and practice in his book Genesis of a Music (1947).

Partch composed with scales dividing the octave into 43 unequal tones derived from the natural harmonic series; these scales allowed for more tones of smaller intervals than in standard Western tuning, which uses twelve equal intervals to the octave. To play his music, Partch built many unique instruments, with such names as the Chromelodeon, the Quadrangularis Reversum, and the Zymo-Xyl. Partch described his music as "corporeal" (emphasizing its physical/visceral elements), and distinguished it from abstract music, which he perceived as the dominant trend in Western music since the time of J.S. Bach, whose seminal book of preludes and fugues called The Well-tempered Clavier (in German, Das wohltemperierte Klavier) is often cited as the pivot point beyond which older mean-tone and ancient just intonation tunings were abandoned (in the late-18th century) and the then-future of Western Classical (and popular) instruments were (and most are still) based, for exploitation of all 24 theoretical key signatures. Partch's earliest compositions were small-scale pieces to be intoned with simple folkloric-like string instrumental backing; his later works were large-scale (like a fusion of theater and music decidedly related to but quite apart from Wagnerian opera), they were integrated theater productions in which he expected each of the performers to sing, dance, speak, and play instruments in a "corporeal apotheosis". Ancient Greek theatre and Japanese Noh and kabuki heavily influenced Harry Partch's music theatre.

Encouraged by his mother, Partch learned several instruments at a young age. By fourteen, he was composing, and in particular took to setting dramatic situations. He dropped out of the University of Southern California's School of Music in 1922, dissatisfied with the quality of his teachers. He took to self-study in San Francisco's libraries, where he discovered Hermann von Helmholtz's Sensations of Tone, which convinced him to devote himself to music based on scales tuned in just intonation. In 1930, he burned all his previous compositions in a rejection of the European concert tradition. Partch frequently moved around the US. Early in his career, he was a transient worker, and sometimes a hobo; later he depended on grants, university appointments, and record sales to support himself. In 1970, supporters created the Harry Partch Foundation to administer Partch's music and instruments.

== Personal history ==
=== Early life (1901–1919) ===
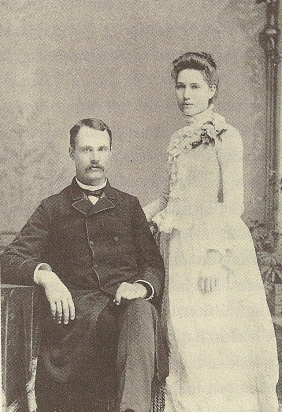
Partch's parents, Virgil and Jennie (1888).

On June 24, 1901, Partch was born in Oakland, California. His parents were Virgil Franklin Partch (1860–1919) and Jennie (née Childers, 1863–1920). The Presbyterian couple were missionaries, serving in China from 1888 to 1893, and again from 1895 to 1900, when they fled the Boxer Rebellion.

Partch moved with his family to Arizona for his mother's health. His father worked for the Immigration Service there, and they settled in the small town of Benson. It was still the Wild West there in the early twentieth century, and Partch recalled seeing outlaws in town. Nearby, there were native Yaqui people, whose music he would hear. His mother sang to him in Mandarin Chinese, and he heard and sang songs in Spanish. His mother encouraged her children to learn music, and he learned the mandolin, violin, piano, reed organ, and cornet. His mother taught him to read music.

In 1913, the family moved to Albuquerque, New Mexico, where Partch began to study the piano seriously. He obtained work playing keyboards for silent films while he was in high school. By 14, he was composing for the piano. He developed an early interest in writing music for dramatic situations, and cited his lost composition Death and the Desert (1916) as an early example.

In 1919, Partch graduated from high school.

=== Early experiments (1919–1947) ===
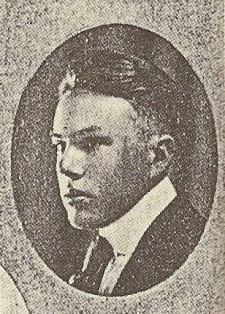
Partch in 1919

The family moved to Los Angeles in 1919 following the death of Partch's father. There, his mother was killed in a trolley accident in 1920. He enrolled in the University of Southern California's School of Music in 1920, but was dissatisfied with his teachers and left after the summer of 1922. He moved to San Francisco and studied books on music in the libraries there and continued to compose. In 1923 he came to reject the standard twelve-tone equal temperament of Western concert music when he discovered a translation of Hermann von Helmholtz's Sensations of Tone. The book pointed Partch towards just intonation as an acoustic basis for his music. Around this time, while working as an usher for the Los Angeles Philharmonic, he had a romantic relationship with the actor Ramon Novarro, then known by his birth name Ramón Samaniego; Samaniego broke off the affair when he started to become successful in his acting career.

By 1925, Partch was putting his theory into practice by developing paper coverings for violin and viola with fingerings in just intonation, and wrote a string quartet using such tunings. He put his theories in words in May 1928 in the first draft for a book, then called Exposition of Monophony. He supported himself during this time doing a variety of jobs, including teaching piano, proofreading, and working as a sailor. In New Orleans in 1930, he resolved to break with the European tradition entirely, and burned all his earlier scores in a potbelly stove.

Partch had a New Orleans violin maker build a viola with the fingerboard of a cello. He used this instrument, dubbed the Adapted Viola, to write music using a scale with twenty-nine tones to the octave. Partch's earliest work to survive comes from this period, including works based on Biblical verse and Shakespeare, and Seventeen Lyrics of Li Po (1931-1933) based on translations of the Chinese poetry of Li Bai. (Note: "Li Po" and "Li Bai" are different renderings of the same name: 李白.) In 1932, Partch performed the music in San Francisco and Los Angeles with sopranos he had recruited. A February 9, 1932, performance at Henry Cowell's New Music Society of California attracted reviews. A private group of sponsors sent Partch to New York in 1933, where he gave solo performances and won the support of composers Roy Harris, Charles Seeger, Henry Cowell, Howard Hanson, Otto Luening, Walter Piston, and Aaron Copland.

Partch unsuccessfully applied for Guggenheim grants in 1933 and 1934. The Carnegie Corporation of New York granted him $1500 so he could do research in England. He gave readings at the British Museum and traveled in Europe. He met W. B. Yeats in Dublin, whose translation of Sophocles' King Oedipus he wanted to set to his music; he studied the spoken inflection in Yeats's recitation of the text. He built a keyboard instrument, the Chromatic Organ, which used a scale with forty-three tones to the octave. He met musicologist Kathleen Schlesinger, who had recreated an ancient Greek kithara from images she found on a vase at the British Museum. Partch made sketches of the instrument in her home, and discussed ancient Greek music theory with her. Partch returned to the U.S. in 1935 at the height of the Great Depression, and spent a transient nine years, often as a hobo, picking up work or obtaining grants from organizations such as the Federal Writers' Project. For the first eight months of this period, he kept a journal which was published posthumously as Bitter Music, in which Partch included notation on the speech inflections of people he met in his travels. He continued to compose music, build instruments, develop his book and theories, and create his first recordings. He had alterations made by sculptor and designer friend Gordon Newell to the Kithara sketches he had created in England. After taking some woodworking courses in 1938, he built his first Kithara in Big Sur California at a scale of roughly twice the size of Schlesinger's. In 1942 in Chicago, he built his Chromelodeon—another 43-tone reed organ. He was staying on the eastern coast of the U.S. when he was awarded a Guggenheim grant in March 1943 to construct instruments and complete a seven-part Monophonic Cycle. On April 22, 1944, the first performance of his Americana series of compositions was given at Carnegie Chamber Music Hall put on by the League of Composers.

=== University work (1947–1962) ===
In early 1944, Partch began a long friendship with pianist Gunnar Johansen, artist-in-residence at the University of Wisconsin-Madison, and his wife Lorraine. With Johansen’s enthusiastic support, Partch visited Madison and received a grant from the UW Research Committee. Partch then spent much of that summer with the Johansens at their property in Gualala, California. For the next two years Partch worked in Madison, supported by various University grants. This was a productive period, in which he lectured, trained an ensemble, staged performances, released his first recordings, and completed his book, now called Genesis of a Music. Genesis was completed in 1947 and published in 1949 by the University of Wisconsin Press. He left the university in 1947, as it never accepted him as a member of the permanent staff, and there was little space for his growing stock of instruments.

Partch returned to the Johansens's Gualala property briefly in 1947, then took up more permanent residence there in late 1948. He converted one of the ranch's outbuildings, formerly a smithy, into a studio. Partch worked there with support from the Guggenheim Foundation, and made recordings, primarily of his Eleven Intrusions (1949–1950). He was assisted for six months by composer Ben Johnston, who performed on Partch's recordings. In early 1951, Partch moved to Oakland for health reasons, and prepared for a production of King Oedipus at Mills College, with the support of designer Arch Lauterer. Performances of King Oedipus in March were extensively reviewed, but a planned recording was blocked by the Yeats estate, which refused to grant permission to use Yeats's translation of Sophocles's play. (Note: A recording with Yeats' translation has since been released, as Yeats's text has passed into the public domain.)

In February 1953, Partch founded a studio, named Gate 5, in an abandoned shipyard in Sausalito, California, where he composed, built instruments and staged performances. Subscriptions to raise money for recordings were organized by the Harry Partch Trust Fund, an organization put together by friends and supporters. The recordings were sold via mail order, as were later releases on the Gate 5 Records label. The money raised from these recordings became his main source of income. Partch's three Plectra and Percussion Dances, Ring Around the Moon (1949–1950), Castor and Pollux, and Even Wild Horses, premiered on Berkeley's KPFA radio in November 1953.

After completing The Bewitched in January 1955, Partch tried to find the means to put on a production of it. Ben Johnston introduced Danlee Mitchell to Partch at the University of Illinois; Mitchell later became Partch's heir. In March 1957, with the help of Johnston and the Fromm Foundation, The Bewitched was performed at the University of Illinois, and later at Washington University in St. Louis, though Partch was displeased with choreographer Alwin Nikolais's interpretation. Later in 1957, Partch provided the music for Madeline Tourtelot's film Windsong, the first of six film collaborations between the two. From 1959 to 1962, Partch received further appointments from the University of Illinois, and staged productions of Revelation in the Courthouse Park (Note: Revelation in the Courthouse Park was based on The Bacchae by ancient Greek dramatist Euripides.) in 1961 and Water! Water! in 1962. Though these two works were based, as King Oedipus had been, on Greek mythology, they modernized the settings and incorporated elements of popular music. Partch had support from several departments and organizations at the university, but continuing hostility from the music department convinced him to leave and return to California.

=== Later life in California (1962–1974) ===
Partch set up a studio in late 1962 in Petaluma, California, in a former chick hatchery. There he composed And on the Seventh Day, Petals Fell in Petaluma. He left northern California in summer 1964, and spent his remaining decade in various cities in southern California. He rarely had university work during this period, and lived on grants, commissions, and record sales. A turning point in his popularity was the 1969 Columbia LP The World of Harry Partch, the first modern recording of Partch's music and his first release on a major record label.

His final theater work was Delusion of the Fury, which incorporated music from Petaluma, and was first produced at the University of California in early 1969. In 1970, the Harry Partch Foundation was founded to handle the expenses and administration of Partch's work. His final completed work was the soundtrack to Betty Freeman's The Dreamer that Remains. He retired to San Diego in 1973, where he died after suffering a heart attack on September 3, 1974. The same year, a second edition of Genesis of a Music was published with extra chapters about work and instruments Partch made since the book's original publication.

In 1991, Partch's journals from June 1935 to February 1936 were discovered and published—journals that Partch had believed to have been lost or destroyed. In 1998, musicologist Bob Gilmore published a biography of Partch.

== Personal life ==
Partch was first cousins with gag cartoonist Virgil Partch (1916–1984). Partch believed he was sterile due to childhood mumps, and he had a romantic relationship with the film actor Ramon Novarro.

== Legacy ==
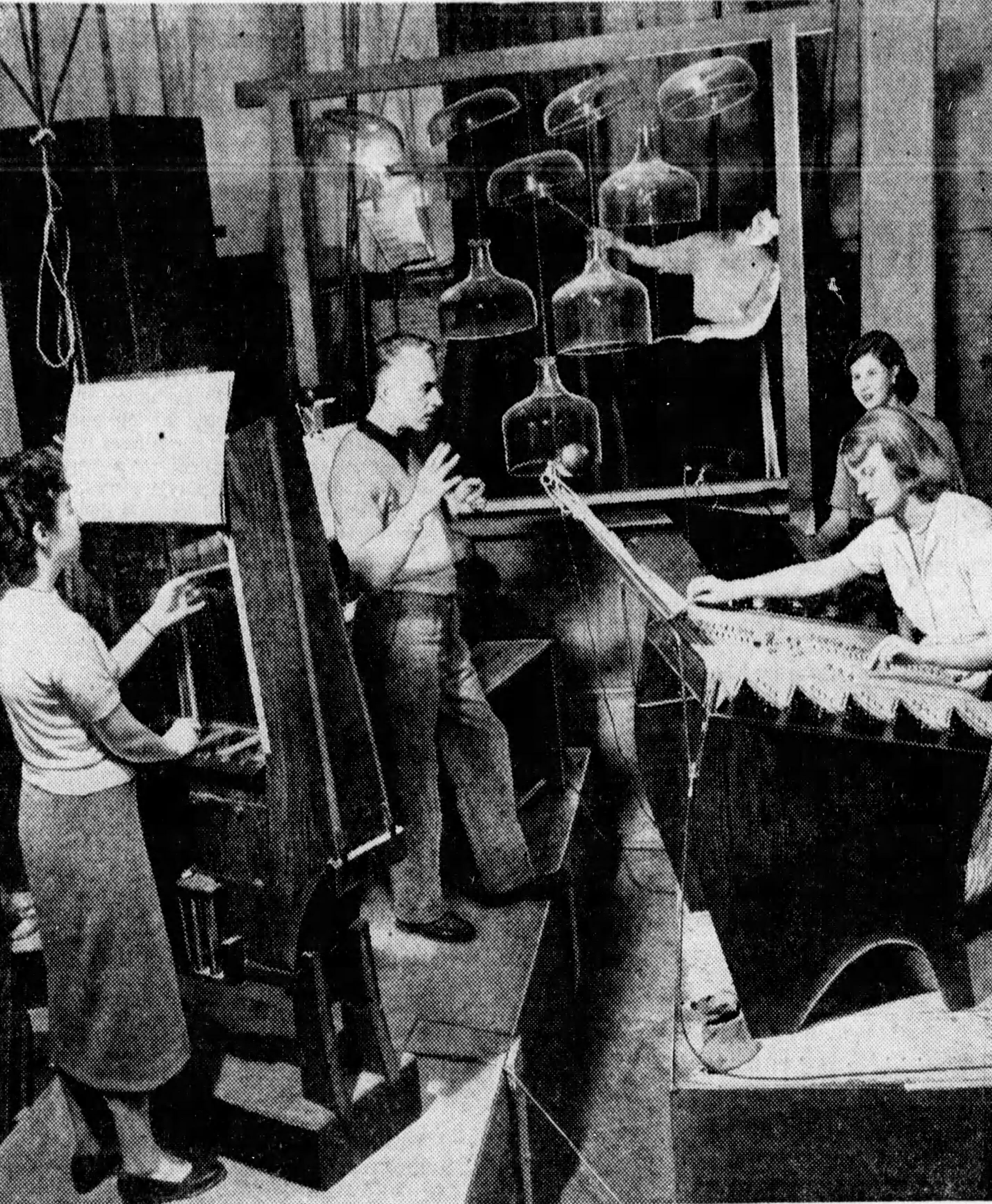
Partch (center) directing four college students in rehearsal

Partch met Danlee Mitchell while he was at the University of Illinois; Partch made Mitchell his heir, and Mitchell serves as the executive director of the Harry Partch Foundation. Dean Drummond and his group Newband took charge of Partch's instruments, and performed his repertoire. After Drummond's death in 2013, Charles Corey, a former doctoral student of Drummond, assumed responsibility for the instruments.

The Sousa Archives and Center for American Music in Urbana, Illinois, holds the Harry Partch Estate Archive, 1918–1991, which consists of Partch's personal papers, musical scores, films, tapes and photographs documenting his career as a composer, writer, and producer. It also holds the Music and performing Arts Library Harry Partch Collection, 1914–2007, which consists of books, music, films, personal papers, artifacts and sound recordings collected by the staff of the Music and Performing Arts Library and the University of Illinois School of Music documenting the life and career of Harry Partch, and those associated with him, throughout his career as a composer and writer.

Partch's notation is an obstacle, as it mixes a sort of tablature with indications of pitch ratios. This makes it difficult for those trained in traditional Western notation, and gives no visual indication as to what the music is intended to sound like.

Paul Simon used Partch's instruments in the creation of songs for his 2016 album Stranger to Stranger.

Ron Asheton of The Stooges names Partch as a major influence on the band: "we listened to a lot of Harry Partch." Michael S. Bengal writes in The Music and Noise of the Stooges, 1967-71: Lost in the Future that Partch's music was a "huge influence on the Stooges from the beginning."

=== Recognition ===
In 1974, Partch was inducted into the Hall of Fame of the Percussive Arts Society, a music service organization promoting percussion education, research, performance and appreciation. In 2004, U.S. Highball was selected by the Library of Congress's National Recording Preservation Board as "culturally, historically, or aesthetically significant".

== Music ==
=== Theory ===
The 11-limit tonality diamond, part of the basis for Partch's music theory

Partch made public his theories in his book Genesis of a Music (1947). He opens the book with an overview of music history, and argues that Western music began to suffer from the time of Bach, after which twelve-tone equal temperament was adopted to the exclusion of other tuning systems, and abstract, instrumental music became the norm. Partch sought to bring vocal music back to prominence, and adopted tunings and scales he believed more suitable to singing.

Inspired by Sensations of Tone, Hermann von Helmholtz's book on acoustics and the perception of sound, Partch based his music strictly on just intonation. He tuned his instruments using the overtone series, and extended it up to the eleventh partial. This allowed for a larger number of smaller, unequal intervals than found in the Western classical music tradition's twelve-tone equal temperament. Partch's tuning is often classed as microtonality, as it allowed for intervals smaller than 100 cents, though Partch did not conceive his tuning in such a context. Instead, he saw it as a return to pre-Classical Western musical roots, in particular to the music of the ancient Greeks. By taking the principles he found in Helmholtz's book, he expanded his tuning system until it allowed for a division of the octave into 43 tones based on ratios of small integers.

Partch uses the terms Otonality and Utonality to describe chords whose pitch classes are the harmonics or subharmonics of a given fixed tone. These six-tone chords function in Partch's music much the same that the three-tone major and minor chords (or triads) do in classical music. The Otonalities are derived from the overtone series, and the Utonalities from the undertone series.

Genesis of a Music has been influential on later generations of composers interested in new intonational systems, such Ben Johnston and James Tenney (both of whom worked with Partch in the 1950s).

=== Style ===
The age of specialization has given us an art of sound that denies sound, and a science of sound that denies art. The age of specialization has given us a music drama that denies drama, and a drama that—contrary to the practices of all other peoples of the world—denies music.

— Partch, in Bitter Music (2000)

Partch rejected the Western concert music tradition, saying that the music of composers such as Beethoven "has only the feeblest roots" in Western culture. His non-Western orientation was particularly pronounced—sometimes explicitly, as when he set to music the poetry of Li Bai, or when he combined two Noh dramas with one from Ethiopia in The Delusion of the Fury.

Partch believed that Western music of the 20th century suffered from over-specialization. He objected to the theatre of the day, which he believed had divorced music and drama, and he strove to create complete, integrated theatre works, in which he expected each performer to sing, dance, play instruments, and take on speaking parts. Partch used the words "ritual" and "corporeal" to describe his theatre works—musicians and their instruments were not hidden in an orchestra pit or offstage, but were a visual part of the performance.

=== Rhythmic range ===
Partch's approach to rhythm ranged from unspecified to complex. In Seventeen Lyrics of Li Po for the Adapted Viola, Partch "doesn't bother with rhythmic notation at all, but simply directs performers to follow the natural rhythms of the poem." His rhythmic structures that were specified in Castor and Pollux were far more structured: "Each of the duets last 234 beats. In the first half (Castor) the music alternates between 4 and 5 beats to a bar, and there's usually a rest on the eighth of the nine beats. In the second half (Pollux) the rhythm's a bit more complicated, with six bars of 7 beats alternating with six bars of 9 beats until 234 beats are reached."

=== Instruments ===
Partch called himself "a philosophic music-man seduced into carpentry". The path towards Partch's use of various unique instruments was gradual. He began in the 1920s using traditional instruments, and wrote a string quartet in just intonation (now lost). He had his first specialized instrument built for him in 1930—the Adapted Viola, a viola with a cello's neck fitted on it.

Most of Partch's works exclusively used the instruments he had created. Some works made use of unaltered standard instruments such as clarinet or cello; Revelation in the Courtyard Park (1960) used an unaltered small wind band, and Yankee Doodle Fantasy (1944) used unaltered oboe and flute.

In 1991, Dean Drummond became the custodian of the original Harry Partch instrument collection until his death in 2013. In 1999 Drummond brought the instruments to Montclair State University in Montclair, New Jersey, where they resided until November 2014, when they were moved to the University of Washington, Seattle. They are currently under the care of Charles Corey, Drummond's former PhD student.

In 2012 a complete set of replicas was built by Thomas Meixner under commission by Ensemble Musikfabrik and used in performances of Partch's work including Delusion of the Fury.

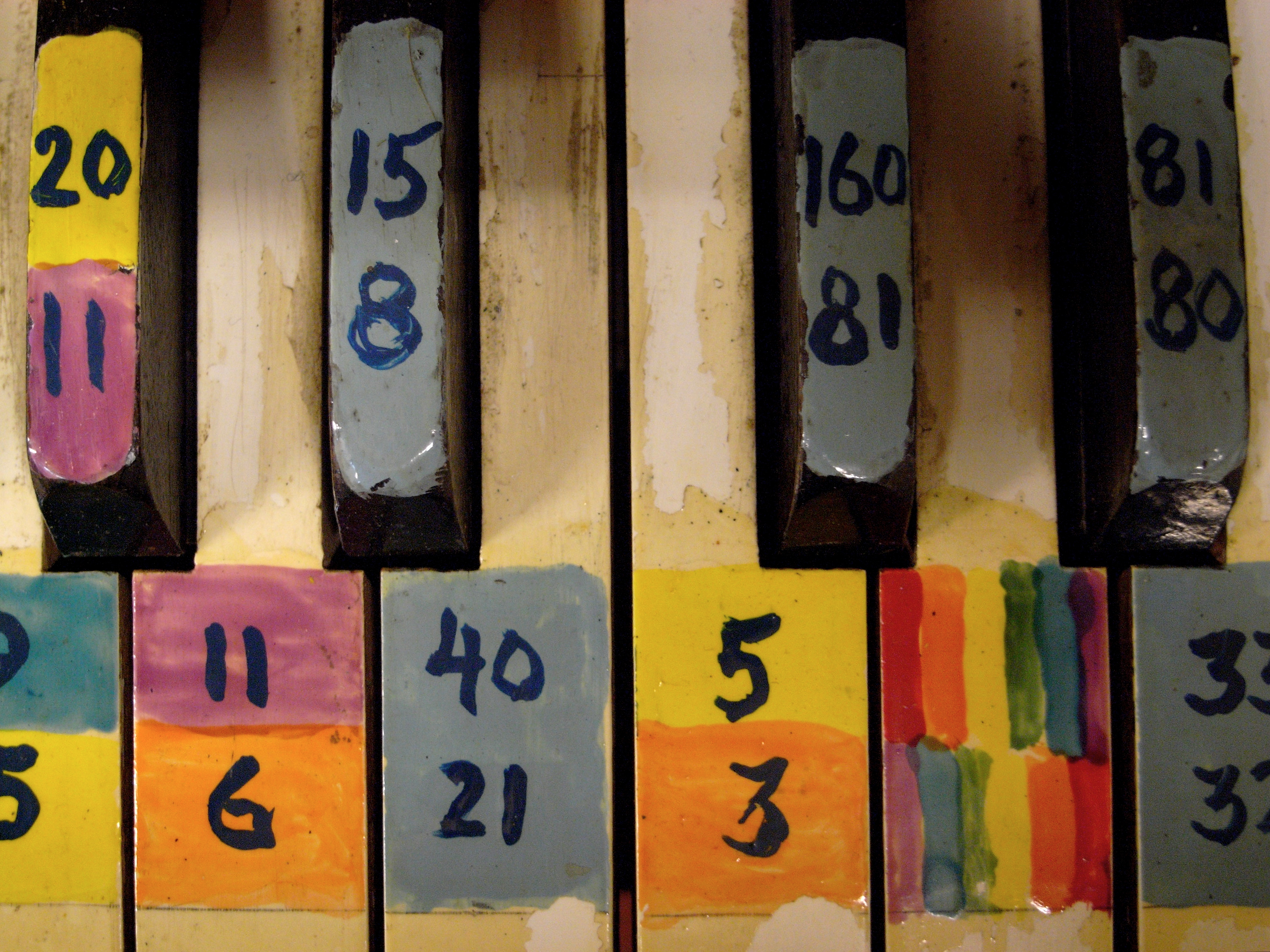
Part of the keyboard of the Chromelodeon

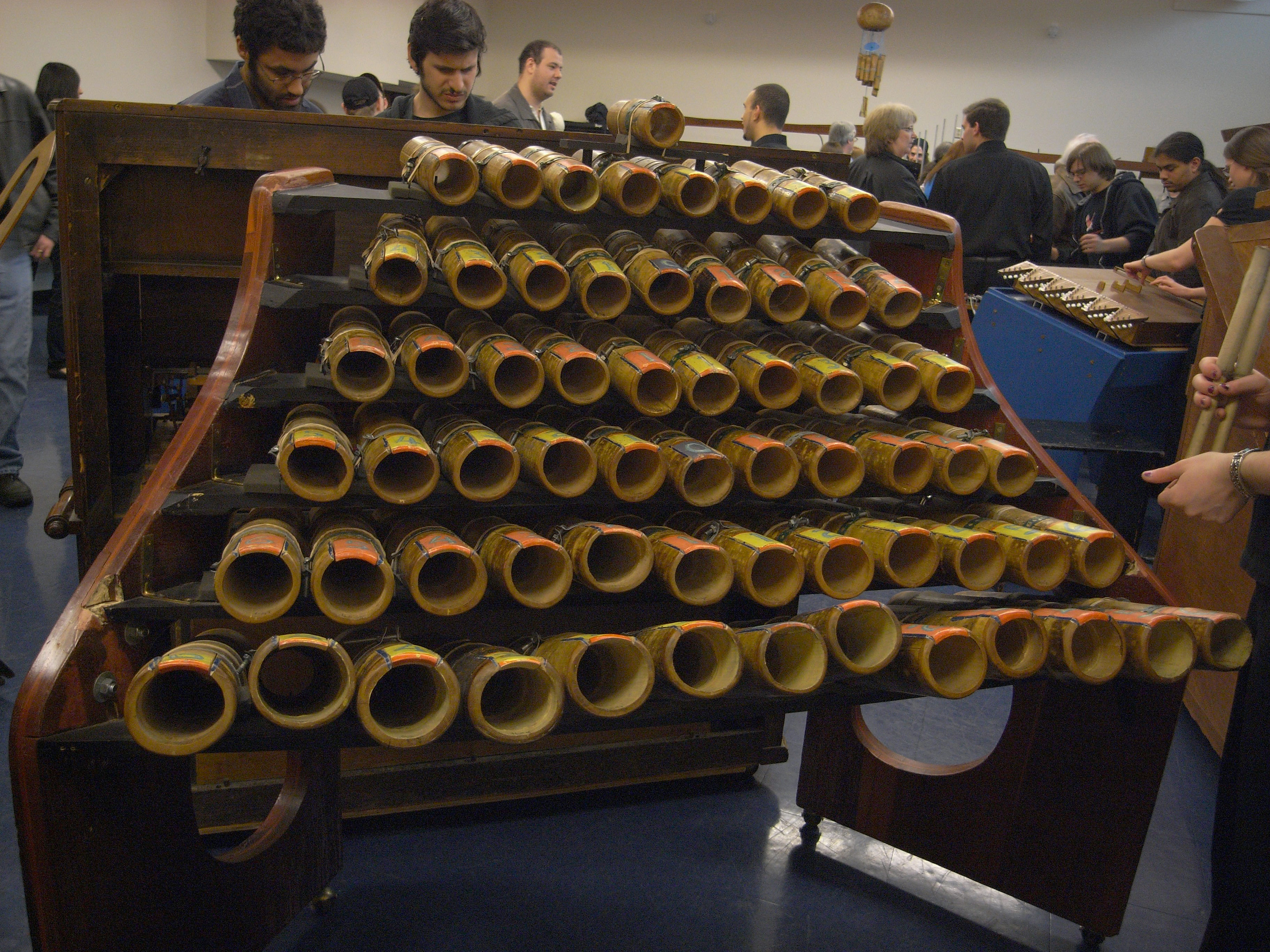
Boo II on display at a Harry Partch Institute open house

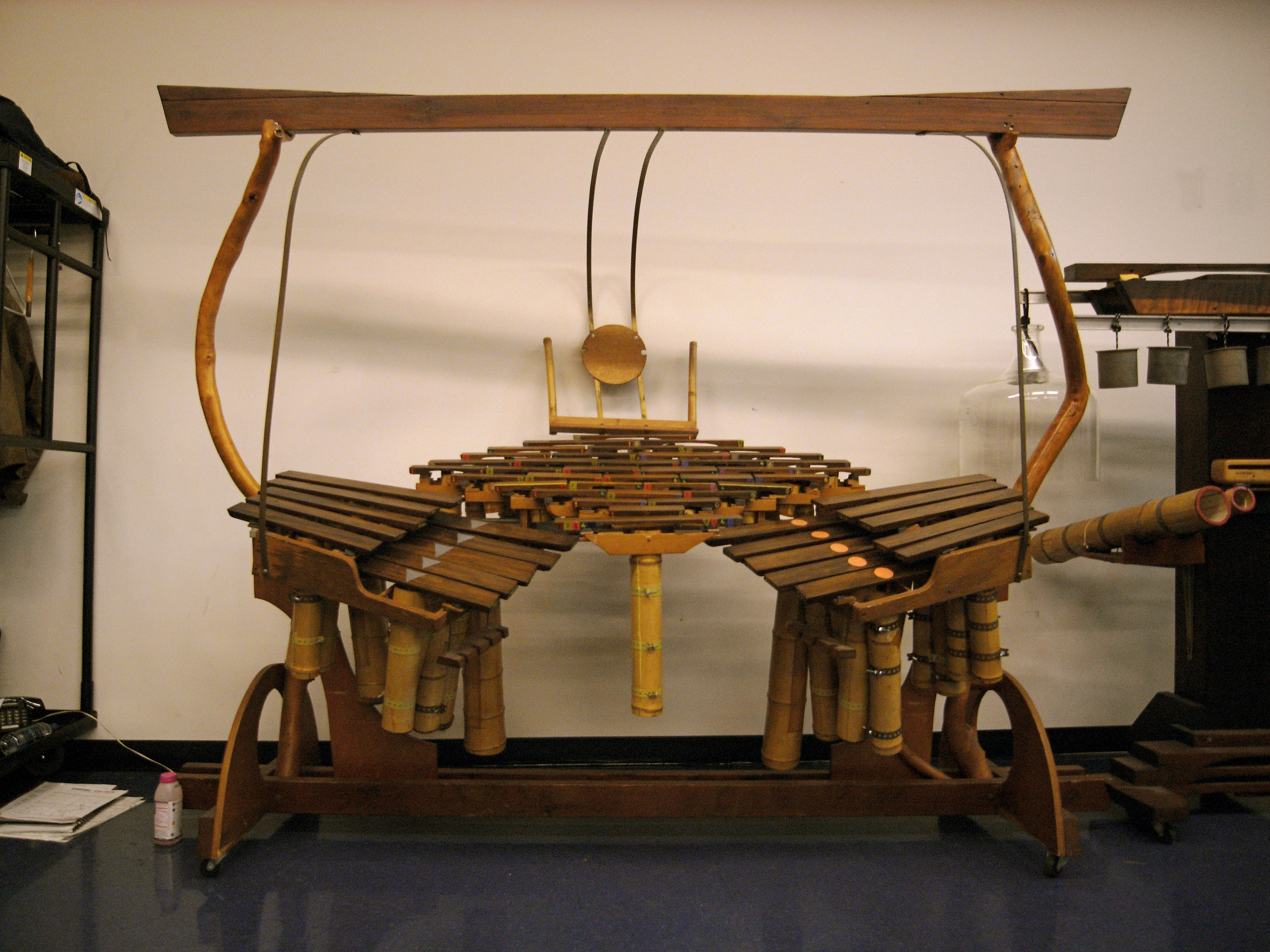
Quadrangularis Reversum

== Works ==
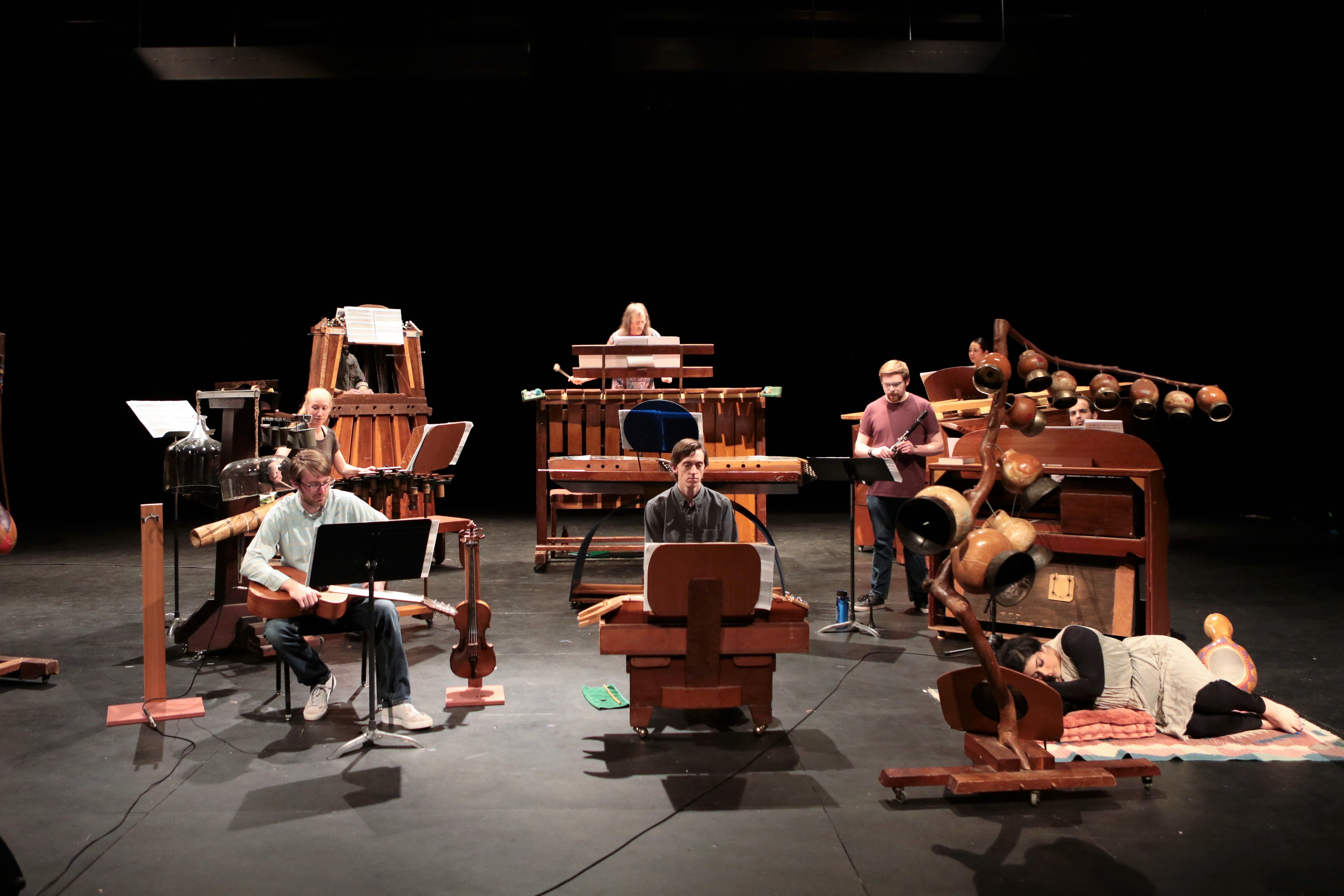
The Harry Partch Ensemble (2019).

Partch's later works were large-scale, integrated theater productions in which he expected each of the performers to sing, dance, speak, and play instruments.

Partch described the theory and practice of his music in his book Genesis of a Music, which he had published first in 1947, and in an expanded edition in 1974. A collection of essays, journals, and librettos by Partch was published as posthumously as Bitter Music 1991.

Partch partially supported himself with the sales of recordings, which he began making in the late 1930s. He published his recordings under the Gate 5 Records label beginning in 1953. On recordings such as the soundtrack to Windsong, he used multitrack recording, which allowed him to play all the instruments himself. He never used synthesized or computer-generated sounds, though he had access to such technology. Partch scored six films by Madeline Tourtelot, starting with 1957's Windsong. He has been the subject of a number of documentary films.
