= David Stock =

American composer and conductor (1939–2015)

David Frederick Stock (June 3, 1939 – November 2, 2015) was an American composer and conductor.

Stock was a longtime resident of Pittsburgh, Pennsylvania, where he served as a professor of composition and as the conductor of the Contemporary Ensemble at Duquesne University.

In 1976, he founded the Pittsburgh New Music Ensemble, and was the music director for 23 years until his retirement in 1999.

He was the composer in residence for the Pittsburgh Symphony Orchestra during the 1987–88 season, and for the Seattle Symphony Orchestra for the 1996–97 season. Among his many compositions are Kickoff, premiered by the New York Philharmonic under Kurt Masur during the Orchestra's 150th Anniversary; Violin Concerto, premiered by Andres Cardenes and the Pittsburgh Symphony under Lorin Maazel for that Orchestra's 100th Anniversary; and Second Symphony, premiered by the Seattle Symphony under Gerard Schwarz.

Jewish music significantly influenced Stock's work for some 25 years, he told the Chronicle in 2013.

== Works ==
=== Orchestral ===
- A Joyful Noise (1983)
- American Accents (1984)
- Andiamo! (2013)
- Back to Bass-ics for String Orchestra (1985)
- Blast! (2010)
- Capriccio for Small Orchestra (1963)
- Divertimento (1957/1979)
- Drive Time (1996)
- Fanfarria from In The High Country (1993)
- Fast Break (1998)
- In the Fast Lane (2010)
- In the High Country (1996)
- Inner Space (1973)
- Kickoff (1990)
- Knockout (1998)
- Like The Wind From Symphony No. 2 (1996)
- Night in Jerusalem (2006)
- On the Shoulders of Giants (1986)
- Plenty of Horn (2005)
- Power Play (1993)
- Rockin'Rondo (1987)
- String Set (1993)
- Suenos de Sefarad for String Orchestra (2015)
- Symphony in One Movement (1963)
- Symphony No. 2 (1996)
- Symphony No. 3: Tikkun Olam (1999)
- Symphony No. 4 (2001)
- Symphony No. 5: In Tempore Belli (2002)
- Symphony No. 6 (2012)
- The Center Holds (1991)
- Triflumena (1978)
- Yizkor for String Orchestra (1999)
- Zohar (1978)

=== Wind ensemble and band ===
- Black and Gold Overture for Brass Band (2008)
- Fanfare for Duquesne for brass choir and percussion (2001)
- March from "On the Shoulders of Giants" (1990)
- Nine-One-One (2002)
- No Man's Land (1998)
- Nova (1974)
- The 'Sliberty Stomp (1985)

=== Concertante ===
- Cello Concerto (2001)
- Chamber Concerto for Saxophone (2014)
- Clarinet Concerto (2004)
- Concerto for Oboe, Clarinet and Orchestra (2013)
- Concerto for Saxophone Quartet and Wind Symphony (2002)
- Concierto Cubano for Violin and String Orchestra (2000)
- Double Take for Solo Alto Saxophone, Solo Percussion and Wind Symphony (2008)
- Earth Beat for Solo Timpani and Wind Symphony (1992)
- Evensong for Solo English horn and Wind Orchestra (1985)
- Flute Concerto (2007)
- M'bonda Na Mabinda for African Drums and Brass Band (2000)
- Oborama (2010)
  - I Dark, Somber (English Horn)
  - II Crisp, Bright (Musette)
  - III Graceful, Wistful (Oboe D'amore)
  - IV Dark, Solemn (Bass Oboe)
  - V Very Fast (Oboe)
- Percussion Concerto (2007)
- Taking Sides for 2 violin soli, string orchestra and percussion (2011)
- Tekiah for Trumpet and Chamber Ensemble (1987)
- The Body Electric for Solo Amplified Contrabass and Wind Symphony (1977)
- The Philosopher's Stone for Solo Violin and Nine Players (1980)
- The Winds of Summer for Solo Saxophone and Band (1989)
- Viola Concerto (1997)
- Violin Concerto (1995)
- Yerusha for Solo Clarinet and Seven Players (1986)

=== Chamber and instrumental ===
- A Conscious Stream for Flute and Piano (2011)
- A Gentle Breeze for Solo Cello (2013)
- A Little Lightmusic for Flute, Clarinet, Vibraphone, Violin, Cello and Piano (1992)
- A Vanished World for Flute, Viola and Harp (1999)
- Anasazi Moonlight for Clarinet, Bassoon and Piano (2001)
- Autumn Wind for solo bass clarinet (2006)
- Available Light for large chamber ensemble (1994)
- Balkan Brass for brass quartet (2010)
- Blustery Wind for solo double bass (2003)
- Brass Rubbing for 6 Trumpets (1976)
- Breathless for Soprano Sax and Percussion (2007)
- Chameleon for solo violin (2001)
- Circling the Square for Marimba and Saxophone Quartet (2008)
- Dark Wind for cello solo (2000)
- Desert Wind for solo English Horn (2005)
- Dreamwinds for Woodwind Quintet (1975)
- Eagle Girl for Narrator and 8 Players (2010)
- East Wind for solo piccolo (2000)
- Eitz Chayim (Tree of Life) (2004)
- Elegy for John for Solo Timpani (2014)
- Evening Shadows (1996)
- Festive Fanfare for 4 Trumpets (1985)
- Five Four Letter Words for Flute, Clarinet, Violin, Cello and Percussion (2010)
- Flying Time for Percussion (1999)
- For Cl - Aaron - et (solo clarinet) (1993)
- For Emily for Baroque Violin, Gamba and Theorbo (2003)
- Four Corners for Marimba Quartet (2011)
- Four for Four for Clarinet, Trumpet, Percussion and Piano (2007)
- Fun der Alte Welt for violin, viola and cello (2012)
- Ghost Wind for solo horn (2005)
- Go for Two for alto saxophone and piano (2012)
- Heir Play for solo recorder (1987)
- Icicles for Piccolo, Oboe, E♭ Clarinet (1976)
- In G for percussion and piano (1980)
- In Still Air for Flute and Percussion (2012)
- Into the Whirlwind for Flute, Cello, Vibes and Percussion (2006)
- Jerry's Jump for solo flute (1997)
- Joseph Had a Little Overcoat for Narrator and Chamber Ensemble (2003)
- June 29, 1999 for Narrator and Chamber Ensemble (2004)
- Keep the Change for "Any 5 Treble-Clef Instruments" (1981)
- Klezmer Dreams for Flute, Clarinet and String Quartet (2013)
- Lev Adin (Gentle Heart) for violin and piano (2001)
- Little Star for solo glockenspiel (2012)
- Lovebirds for Violin and Harp (2000)
- Mistral for Oboe and Harp (2009)
- Mixed Metaphors for violin and piano (2011)
- Mourning Wind for solo contrabassoon (2007)
- Night Birds for 4 (or More Celli) (1975)
- Night for Clarinet, Violin and Cello (1980)
- Night Vision for mixed septet (1989)
- North Wind for solo bassoon (2001)
- October Mountain for solo trumpet (1979)
- On Eastern Time for solo violin (2012)
- Paisaje Hispanico for flute and piano (2002)
- Parallel Worlds for large chamber ensemble (1984)
- Past Tense for large chamber ensemble (1998)
- Pentacles for Brass Quintet (1978)
- Persona for Clarinet, Violin, Cello, Piano and Percussion (1980)
- Playful Wind for solo oboe (2005)
- Quick Opener for large chamber ensemble (1987)
- Quintet for Clarinet and Strings (1966)
- Quintet for Flute and String Quartet (2007)
- Refuge for cello and piano (1998)
- Restless Wind for solo saxophone (2003)
- Rosewood Reflections for solo marimba (2001)
- Santa Fe Salsa for violin and piano (1996)
- Sax Appeal for 4 Saxophones (1990)
- Sea of Reeds for Oboe, Clarinet and Bassoon (2003)
- Second Chamber Concerto for solo trumpet, 2 pianos, 2 percussion (2015)
- Serenade for Five Instruments for Flute, Clarinet, Horn, Viola and Cello (1964)
- Shadow Music for 5 percussion and harp (1964/1979)
- Sizzle for Solo Percussion and 8 Winds (2011)
- Something Sultry for Alto Flute and Marimba (2001)
- Sonidos de la Noche for Clarinet, Violin, Cello and Piano (1994)
- South Wind for Viola Solo (2001)
- Starlight for Clarinet and Percussion (1979)
- Strike, Swinging for solo percussion (2006)
- String Quartet [No.1] (1962)
- String Quartet No. 2: Speaking Extravagantly (1981)
- String Quartet No. 3 (1994)
- String Quartet No. 4 (1997)
- String Quartet No. 5 (2005)
- String Quartet No. 6 (2000)
- String Quartet No. 7 (2006)
- String Quartet No. 8 (2007)
- String Quartet No. 9 (2011)
- String Quartet No. 10 (2012)
- String Quartet No. 11 (2013)
- String Quartet No. 12 (2013)
- String Quartet No. 13 (2015)
- String Trio for Violin, Viola and Cello (2009)
- Suenos de Sefarad for string quartet (2006)
- Sulla Spiaggia for Alto Flute, English Horn, Bass Clarinet, Electric Piano and Percussion (1985)
- Sunrise Sarabande for 4 Recorders (1998)
- Tesuque Morning for solo flute (1999)
- The Particle Zoo for large chamber ensemble (1989)
- Three Miniatures for solo clarinet (1983)
- Three Sketches for Violin Duo (2009)
- Three Vignettes for Solo Marimba (2009)
- Triple Crown for Cello, Piano and Percussion (2009)
- Triple Play for Piccolo, Double Bass and Percussion (1970)
- Trompeta Dorada for solo trumpet (1999)
- T'ruah for brass quintet (2013)
- Two for the Road for violin duo (2005)
- U-Turn for Percussion Quartet (2009)
- Varesesation for 13 percussionists (2013)
- West Wind for solo trombone (2002)
- Wild Card for solo trombone (1979)
- Wind Cave for solo tuba (2007)
- Yiddish Lullaby from A Little Miracle for flute and piano (2000)

=== Vocal and Choral ===
- A Little Miracle for Mezzo-Soprano and Orchestra (1997)
- Adonai mi Sinai for Cantor, SATB Chorus and Piano (2008)
- Beyond Babylon for soprano and piano (1994)
- B'ganee N'tateech for soprano solo and men's chorus (1998)
- For the Blessings for 3 part women's chorus (2003)
- Four Songs of Marge Piercy for Mezzo Soprano and Piano (2005)
- Hostage for Baritone and 6 Players (2005)
- Psalm 96 for Soprano, Tenor and Organ (1996)
- Rumi Sings of Love for Soprano and 15 Players (2008)
- Something Awaits for baritone voice and piano (2000)
- Spirits for SATB Chorus, Harp, Electric Piano and Percussion (1976)
- Three Yiddish Songs for Mezzo-Soprano and String Quartet (2010/2011)
- Up Country Fishing for Soprano and Violin (1982)
- V'eirastich Li for Soprano, Mezzo-Soprano and Piano (2002)
- You Shall Have Nothing but Joy for mezzo-soprano and piano (2011)
