= Pittsburgh New Music Ensemble =

American ensemble

The Pittsburgh New Music Ensemble (PNME) was an American ensemble dedicated to the performance of contemporary classical music. Based in Pittsburgh, Pennsylvania, the group was established by composer David Stock in 1976. It has premiered over 200 works and is a major regional cultural attraction . Emphasis is placed on pieces by modern composers and recent past seasons have featured works by György Ligeti, Frederic Rzewski, George Crumb, John Cage, David Lang, Robert Black and others.

In 2001, conductor Kevin Noe took over from the group's founder, becoming the new Artistic Director. The troupe quickly made radical changes and struck out in a new direction using an entirely new team of musicians and artists. Since that time, PNME programs are carefully structured to create thematic unity and theatrical continuity similar to that of drama or film. Set changes are minimized and carefully choreographed to eliminate the disruption between pieces. Non-musical elements such as video, projected images and spoken word are added to enhance continuity over the arc of a performance. Programs are often presented seamlessly without intermission or even pauses between works. Also, theatrical elements such as lighting, costuming, and blocking cohere into a dramatic musical experience. PNME Artistic Director Kevin Noe has dubbed this model the “Theater of Music.” Since 2001, the group's attendance has grown by more than 600%, and the number of concerts has more than doubled.

PNME performances take place over a series of weekend concerts in the midsummer in Pittsburgh at the City Theatre. PNME is highly acclaimed for providing a highly stylized visual context for new musical pieces that include film, choreography, performance art and stage lighting.

PNME commissions musical pieces including the Harvey Gaul Composition Competition. The group's Executive Director and Accessibility Coordinator is Pamela Murchison.

The PNME artists include:

Lindsey Goodman (Flute), Conor Llewellyn Hanick (Piano), Timothy Jones (Bass-baritone), Lindsay Kesselman (Soprano), Norbert Lewandowski (Cello), Ian Rosenbaum (Percussion), Eric Jacobs (Clarinet/Bass Clarinet), Nathalie Shaw (Violin), Chris McGlumphy (Sound Design) Andy Ostrowski (Lighting Design)
