= Dean Drummond =

American classical composer (1949–2013)

Dean Drummond (January 22, 1949 – April 13, 2013) was an American composer, arranger, conductor and musician. His music featured microtonality, electronics, and a variety of percussion. He invented a 31-tone instrument called the zoomoozophone in 1978, as well as the microtonal instrument he called the juststrokerods, tuned to Harry Partch's 43-tone per octave scale. From 1990 to his death he was the conservator of the Harry Partch instrumentarium.

== Biography ==
Born in Los Angeles, Drummond studied trumpet and composition at the University of Southern California and California Institute of the Arts. He studied trumpet with Don Ellis and John Clyman, and studied composition with Leonard Stein.

Drummond then worked as a musician for and assistant to the maverick composer and instrument builder Harry Partch. He performed in the premieres of Partch’s large-scale works Daphne of the Dunes, And on the Seventh Day Petals Fell in Petaluma, and Delusion of the Fury. Drummond also participated in recordings made by Partch for the Columbia Masterworks label in the late 1960s.

In 1976, Drummond moved to New York City. A year later he co-founded (with flutist Stefani Starin) the contemporary music ensemble Newband. Newband recorded works by Partch, John Zorn, Joan LaBarbara, John Cage, Anne LeBaron, James Pugliese, and Thelonious Monk, as well as original works by Drummond.

In 1990, he became director and curator of composer/inventor/musician Harry Partch's homemade instruments. Drummond performed many of Partch's compositions on the original instruments (such as kithara, surrogate kithara, harmonic canons, adapted guitar, and cloud chamber bowls), as well as incorporating the instruments into original compositions. Drummond conducted educational workshops, and trained student musicians to play the idiosyncratic instrumentarium.

Drummond was a director of the New York Consortium for New Music for over ten years, and was involved in producing the annual Sonic Boom Festival. At the time of his death he was Associate Professor and Director of the Harry Partch Institute at Montclair State University, New Jersey.

He died in Princeton, NJ, of complications from multiple myeloma on April 13, 2013.

== Works ==
Most of his works are published by Hypersound.

=== Solo instrumental ===
- Suite for Clarinet (1970) - clarinet
- Organ Toccata (1971) - pipe organ
- Cloud Garden II (1974) - piano/celeste/almglocken
- Post Rigabop Mix (1977) - flute
- Copégoro (1978) - percussion
- Columbus Fullmoon (1979/1985) - zoomoozophone
- Different Drums for Different Strokes (1988) - percussion
- Mars Face (1997) - violin and microtonally programmed synthesizer
- Four Miniatures (1997): Syncopation in Glass and Talking Bowls - cloud chamber bowls; Bow, Chords and Zoom and Three Dream Fragments - zoomoozophone duet
- Two Short Zoomoozophone Duos (1997)
- Two Short Solos for Cloud Chamber Bowls (1997)
- Precious Metals (1997) - flute

=== Vocal compositions ===
- Bertrans de Born (1971) - bass-baritone, flute, clarinet, bass clarinet, bassoon, French horn, piano/celeste, string quartet, double bass
- My Data's Gone (1997) - bass and microtonally programmed synthesizer - lyrics by Charles Bernstein
- It Must Be Time (1997) - soprano and microtonally programmed synthesizer - lyrics by Charles Bernstein
- Congressional Record (1999) - baritone and eight instrumentalists - texts from the Congressional Record
- Café Buffé (2006) - opera - five singers, dancers, and eighteen instrumentalists - libretto by Charles Bernstein

=== Works for multiple instrumentalists ===
- Ni Kioku (1971) - flute, celeste, harp, violin, cello, two percussionists
- Dedication (1972) - oboe, harp, string quartet, double bass, three percussionists
- Fission (1972) - flute, oboe, clarinet, bassoon, horn, trumpet, trombone, harp, vibraphone, violin, viola, cello
- Ghost Tangents (1973/1975) - prepared piano, three percussionists
- Cloud Garden I (1974/9) - flute, piano, four percussionists
- Zurrjir (1976) - flute, clarinet, piano/celeste, three percussionists
- Dirty Ferdie (Quartet Version) (1976) - four percussionists
- Little Columbus (1979) (Part 1 of Columbus) (1980) - two percussionists
- Columbus (1980) - flute, three percussionists
- Dirty Ferdie (Octet Version) (1981) - eight percussionists
- Mysteries (Octet Version) (1982/6) - flute, violin, cello, five percussionists
- Mysteries (Quintet Version) (1983) - five percussionists
- Mysteries (Septet Version) (1983) - flute, bass trombone, five percussionists
- Then or Never (1984) - flute, viola, double bass, three percussionists
- Ruby Half Moon (1987) - 2 trumpets, trombone, bass trombone, four percussionists
- Incredible Time (to live and die) (1988) - amplified flute, microtonally programmed synthesizer, three percussionists
- Dance of the Seven Veils (1992) - flute, cello, chromelodeon, microtonally programmed synthesizer, three percussionists
- The Day the Sun Stood Still (1994) - flute, trumpet, cello, microtonally programmed synthesizer, harmonic canons, four percussionists
- Before the Last Laugh (1995) - flute, cello, microtonally programmed synthesizer, three harmonic canons, two percussionists
- The Last Laugh (Der Letzte Mann) (1996) - live film score for the 1924 silent film by F.W. Murnau - flutes, cello, trumpet, chromelodeon, microtonally programmed synthesizer, four harmonic canons, four percussionists
- For the Last Laugh (1998) - suite from the film score - flutes, cello, trumpet, chromelodeon, microtonally programmed synthesizer, four harmonic canons, four percussionists
- M.S. Genitron (2001) - ten percussionists
- Phil Harmonic (2002) - 2 flutes, 2 oboes, 2 clarinets, 2 bassoons, alto saxophone, 2 horns, 2 trumpets, 2 trombones, chromelodeon, zoomoozophone, timpani, percussion, strings

== Films ==
- 1995 - Musical Outsiders: An American Legacy - Harry Partch, Lou Harrison, and Terry Riley. Directed by Michael Blackwood.
