= FLUX Quartet =

The FLUX Quartet is an American string quartet dedicated to the performance of contemporary classical music. It was founded in 1998 and is based in New York City. The group is renowned for its performances of Morton Feldman's String Quartet No. 2, which lasts for more than six hours. It has performed in Carnegie's Zankel Hall and at the Kennedy Center, as well as at art institutions such as EMPAC, The Kitchen, and the Walker Art Center, and music festivals in Australia, Europe, and the Americas. It has also premiered new works on numerous experimental series, including Roulette, Bowerbird, and the Music Gallery. FLUX's radio credits include NPR's All Things Considered, WNYC's New Sounds and Soundcheck, and WFMU's Stochastic Hit Parade. The group's discography includes recordings on the Cantaloupe, Innova, Tzadik, and Cold Blue Music labels, in addition to two critically acclaimed releases on Mode Records that encompass the full catalogue of string quartet works by Morton Feldman.

Strongly influenced by the irreverent spirit and "anything-goes" philosophy of the Fluxus art movement, violinist Tom Chiu founded FLUX in the late '90s. The quartet has since cultivated an uncompromising repertoire that follows neither fashions nor trends, but rather combines yesterday's seminal iconoclasts with tomorrow's new voices. Alongside late 20th-century masters like Cage, Feldman, Ligeti, Nancarrow, Scelsi, and Xenakis, FLUX has premiered more than 100 works by many of today's foremost innovators, including Michael Byron, Julio Estrada, David First, Oliver Lake, Alvin Lucier, Marc Neikrug, Matthew Welch; the group has also performed with many influential artists, including Thomas Buckner, Ornette Coleman, Joan La Barbara, Wadada Leo Smith, Henry Threadgill, and many more. As part of its mission to support future musical pioneers, FLUX actively commissions, and has been awarded grants from the American Composers Forum, USArtists International, Aaron Copland Fund, and the Meet-The-Composer Foundation. FLUX also discovers emerging composers from its many residencies and workshops at colleges, including Wesleyan, Dartmouth, Williams, Princeton, Rice, and the College of William and Mary.

The spirit to expand stylistic boundaries is a trademark of the FLUX Quartet, and thus the quartet avidly pursues projects with genre-transcending artists working in mixed media. These artistic synergies have led to an acclaimed recording with experimental balloonist Judy Dunaway, collaborations with choreographers Pam Tanowitz and Shen Wei, and the 3-D video work Upending with digital art-ensemble, OpenEnded Group. Most recently, FLUX appeared both on film and the soundtrack of River of Fundament, the latest work by visionary artist Matthew Barney and composer Jonathan Bepler.

== Discography ==
- Images From a Closed Ward (2018, New Focus FCR199), by Michael Hersch
