= Newband =

Newband is a contemporary music ensemble devoted to the performance of microtonal music. The group was founded in 1977 by musicians Stefani Starin and Dean Drummond. As a youth, Drummond performed with the maverick composer Harry Partch in a unique ensemble of microtonal instruments that Partch designed and built himself; Drummond performed in the premieres of Partch’s Daphne of the Dunes, And on the Seventh Day Petals Fell in Petaluma, and Delusion of the Fury, as well as on both Partch Columbia Masterworks recordings made during the late 1960s.

Inspired by Partch's example, Drummond began to invent instruments of his own, creating the "zoomoozophone" and "juststrokerods," metal instruments tuned to subsets of Harry Partch's 43-tone microtonal scale. After Partch's death in 1974, Partch's instruments had fallen into disuse and disrepair, being used only occasionally for revivals of Partch's compositions. In 1990, Drummond acquired all of Partch's instruments for Newband. With assistance through residencies at the State University of New York at Purchase (1990-1999) and at Montclair State University (1999-present), Drummond was able to insure and repair all of the instruments, duplicating many of them with new materials.

The Partch instrument collection is now the largest component of Newband, and these instruments are used for performances and recordings of Partch's music. Combined with traditional acoustic and electronic instruments as well as those developed by Drummond, Newband also commissions new works, including Julia Wolfe's Steam, three works by Elizabeth Brown, and many works by Drummond.

As part of their residency at Montclair State University, Newband offers courses to college students that are based around the special instruments of Newband's ensemble, including "Microtonal Music Ensemble" (for which students may compose new works), a study of Partch's life, instruments and musical theories, and "Music Instrument Repair and Invention," in which students replicate Partch's instruments and develop new instruments.

== Members ==
- Dean Drummond (composer, conductor, zoomoozophone, harmonic canons, kithara, surrogate kithara, adapted guitar, spoils of war)
- Stefani Starin (flutes, surrogate kithara, harmonic canons, adapted guitar, chromelodeon, bloboy, drone devil)
- Dominic Donato (zoomoozophone, diamond marimba, bass marimba, boo, cloud chamber bowls, surrogate kithara, spoils of war, juststrokerods, percussion)
- Nina Kellman (harp, kitharas, harmonic canons, adapted guitar)
- Michael Lipsey (zoomoozophone, kithara, harmonic canons, diamond marimba, bass marimba, marimba eroica, cloud chamber bowls, juststrokerods, surrogate kithara, koto, percussion)
- Frank Cassara (zoomoozophone, bass marimba, boo, cloud chamber bowls, juststrokerods, spoils of war, cone gongs, bloboy, percussion)
- Robert Osborne (voice)
- Bill Ruyle (zoomoozophone, juststrokerods, diamond marimba, bass marimba, boo, bloboy, percussion)
- Thomas Kolor (zoomoozophone, bass marimba, kithara, surrogate kithara, harmonic canon, zymo-xyl, bamboo marimba, percussion)
- Gregory Hesselink (cello, tenor violin, adapted guitar, surrogate kithara, gourd tree, cone gongs, crychord, guba gubi)
- Theodore Mook (cello, tenor violin, surrogate kithara, gourd tree, cone gongs, harmonic canon)

== Discography ==
=== Newband Plays Microtonal Works, Volume 1. Mode Records 18. ===
- HARRY PARTCH: Two Studies on Ancient Greek Scales (arranged for flute and zoomoozophone)
- JOHN CAGE: Haikai for Flute and Zoomoozophone
- JOAN LA BARBARA: Silent Scroll
- DEAN DRUMMOND: Columbus
- DEAN DRUMMOND: Incredible Time
- DEAN DRUMMOND: Then or Never

=== Newband Plays Microtonal Works, Volume 2. Mode Records 33. ===
- DEAN DRUMMOND: Different Drums
- THELONIOUS MONK: 'Round Midnight (arranged for cello and zoomoozophone)
- HARRY PARTCH: Daphne of the Dunes
- JAMES PUGLIESE: Freeze
- MATHEW ROSENBLUM: Circadian Rhythms

=== Dance of the Seven Veils. Music and Arts CD931. ===
- HARRY PARTCH: Castor and Pollux
- ANNE LE BARON: Southern Ephemera
- ELIZABETH BROWN: Archipelago
- DEAN DRUMMOND: Dance of the Seven Veils

=== Harry Partch and Dean Drummond. Innova 561. ===
- HARRY PARTCH: Eleven Intrusions
- HARRY PARTCH: Dark Brother
- DEAN DRUMMOND: Before the Last Laugh
- DEAN DRUMMOND: Congressional Record

=== The Wayward. Wergo 6638 2 ===
- HARRY PARTCH: Barstow
- HARRY PARTCH: San Francisco
- HARRY PARTCH: The Letter
- HARRY PARTCH: U.S. Highball

== Films ==
- 1995 - Musical Outsiders: An American Legacy - Harry Partch, Lou Harrison, and Terry Riley. Directed by Michael Blackwood.
