= Boston Modern Orchestra Project =

American orchestra based in Boston

- Orchestra
- Short name: BMOP
- Founded: 1996
- Location: Boston, Massachusetts, US
- Principal conductor: Gil Rose
- Website: www.bmop.org

The Boston Modern Orchestra Project (BMOP) is a professional orchestra founded in 1996 by artistic director Gil Rose in Boston, Massachusetts, United States.

== Background ==
In its first twelve seasons, the BMOP was able to perform over 80 concerts of contemporary orchestral music, commission more than 20 works, present over 70 world premieres, release 20 CDs, produce the inaugural Ditson Festival of Contemporary Music with the Institute of Contemporary Art, Boston, and collaborated to produce performances of contemporary operas (including the Opera Unlimited festival of contemporary chamber opera), releasing nearly 50 CDs in total. The BMOP performs regularly at Boston's Jordan Hall, also performing in major venues on both the East and West Coasts of the United States, including Tanglewood, the Festival of New American Music in Sacramento, California; and the "Music on the Edge" festival in Pittsburgh, Pennsylvania.

== Achievements ==
The orchestra has won the ASCAP Award for Adventurous Programming of Orchestral Music and became the recipient of the John S. Edwards Award for Strongest Commitment to New American Music. In 2015 it was named Musical America's 2016 Ensemble of the Year, the first ever symphony orchestra to receive the award.

In 2008, the BMOP launched its record label, BMOP/sound, with John Harbison's ballet Ulysses. Its five inaugural releases appeared on the "Best of 2008" lists of The New York Times, The Boston Globe, National Public Radio, Time Out New York, DownBeat magazine, and American Record Guide. BMOP/sound has received two Grammy Award nominations: in 2009 for its recording of Charles Fussell's Wilde symphony for baritone and orchestra (Sanford Sylvan Best Classical Vocal Performance), and in 2010 for its recording of Derek Bermel's Voices for solo clarinet and orchestra (Best Instrumental Soloist Performance with Orchestra). The New York Times proclaimed, "BMOP/sound is an example of everything done right."

The BMOP has hosted a composer-in-residence each season since 2000. Meet the Composer and the League of American Orchestras awarded the BMOP one of six three-year Music Alive grants for a collaboration with composer Lisa Bielawa.

The New York Times wrote about the BMOP in 2000: "Mr. Rose and his team filled the music with rich, decisive ensemble colors and magnificent solos. These musicians were rapturous – superb instrumentalists at work and play." Composer John Harbison has said that "No other city has anything resembling the BMOP – with that level of activity, with that sustained productivity ... There's really been no new-music organization with a wider range of inclusion."
