= Interval cycle =

In music, an interval cycle is a collection of pitch classes created from a sequence of the same interval class. In other words, a collection of pitches by starting with a certain note and going up by a certain interval until the original note is reached (e.g. starting from C, going up by 3 semitones repeatedly until eventually C is again reached - the cycle is the collection of all the notes met on the way). In other words, interval cycles "unfold a single recurrent interval in a series that closes with a return to the initial pitch class". See: wikt:cycle.

Interval cycles are notated by George Perle using the letter "C" (for cycle), with an interval class integer to distinguish the interval. Thus the diminished seventh chord would be C3 and the augmented triad would be C4. A superscript may be added to distinguish between transpositions, using 0–11 to indicate the lowest pitch class in the cycle. "These interval cycles play a fundamental role in the harmonic organization of post-diatonic music and can easily be identified by naming the cycle."

Here are interval cycles C2, C3, C4 and C6:

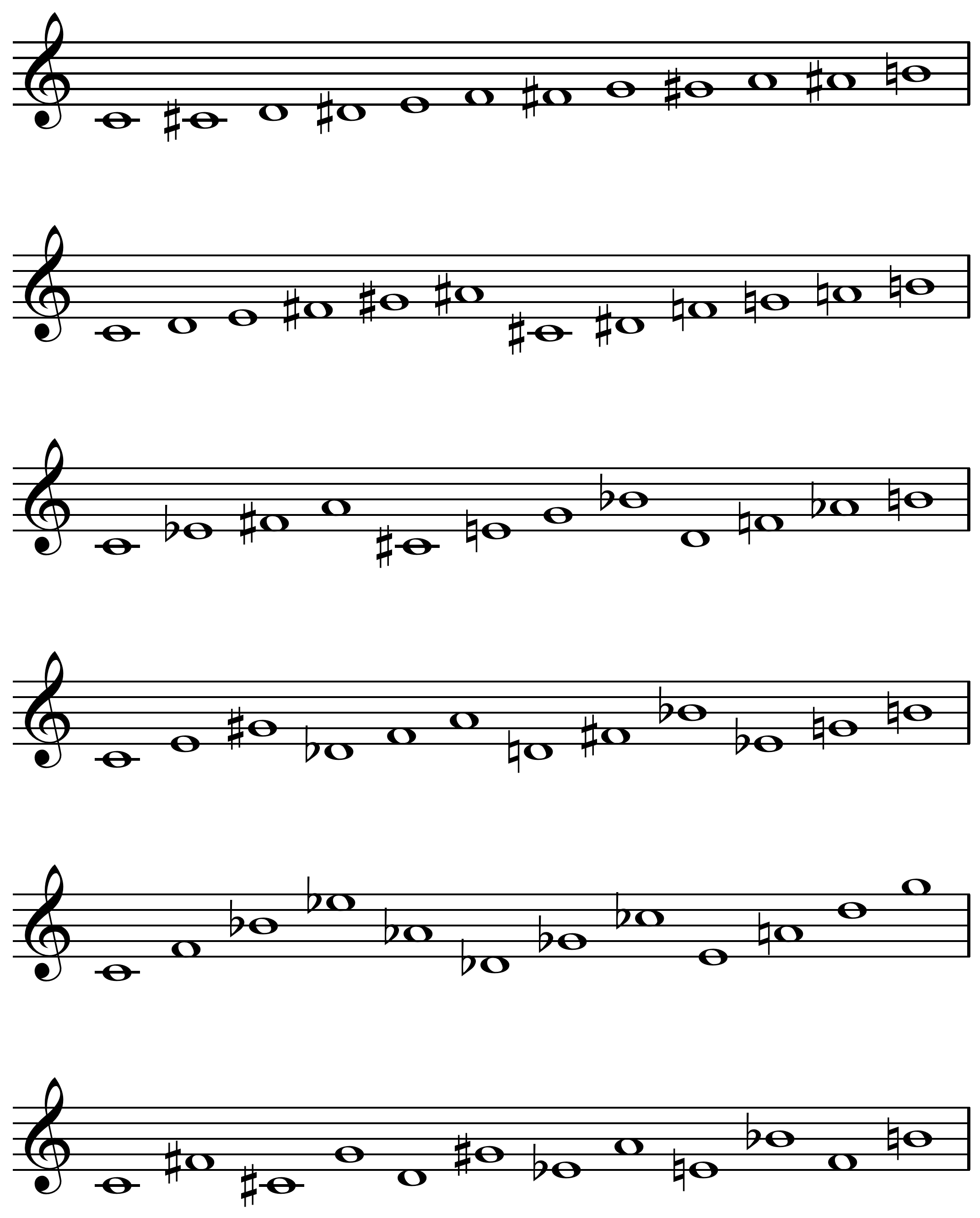
Twelve-tone interval cycles complete the aggregate: C1 once (top) or C6 six times (bottom).

Interval cycles assume the use of equal temperament and may not work in other systems such as just intonation. For example, if the C4 interval cycle used justly-tuned major thirds it would fall flat of an octave return by an interval known as the diesis. Put another way, a major third above G♯ is B♯, which is only enharmonically the same as C in systems such as equal temperament, in which the diesis has been tempered out.

Interval cycles are symmetrical and thus non-diatonic. However, a seven-pitch segment of C7 will produce the diatonic major scale:

This is also known as a generated collection. A minimum of three pitches are needed to represent an interval cycle.

Cyclic tonal progressions in the works of Romantic and late Romantic composers (e.g., Richard Wagner, Johannes Brahms, Gustav Mahler) form a link with the cyclic pitch successions in the atonal music of Modernists such as Béla Bartók, Alexander Scriabin, Edgard Varèse, and the Second Viennese School (Arnold Schoenberg, Alban Berg, and Anton Webern). At the same time, these progressions signal the end of tonality.

Interval cycles are also important in jazz, such as in Coltrane changes.

"Similarly," to any pair of transpositionally related sets being reducible to two transpositionally related representations of the chromatic scale, "the pitch-class relations between any pair of inversionally related sets is reducible to the pitch-class relations between two inversionally related representations of the semitonal scale." Thus an interval cycle or pair of cycles may be reducible to a representation of the chromatic scale.

As such, interval cycles may be differentiated as ascending or descending, with, "the ascending form of the semitonal scale [called] a 'P cycle' and the descending form [called] an 'I cycle'," while, "inversionally related dyads [are called] 'P/I' dyads." P/I dyads will always share a sum of complementation. Cyclic sets are those "sets whose alternate elements unfold complementary cycles of a single interval," that is an ascending and descending cycle:

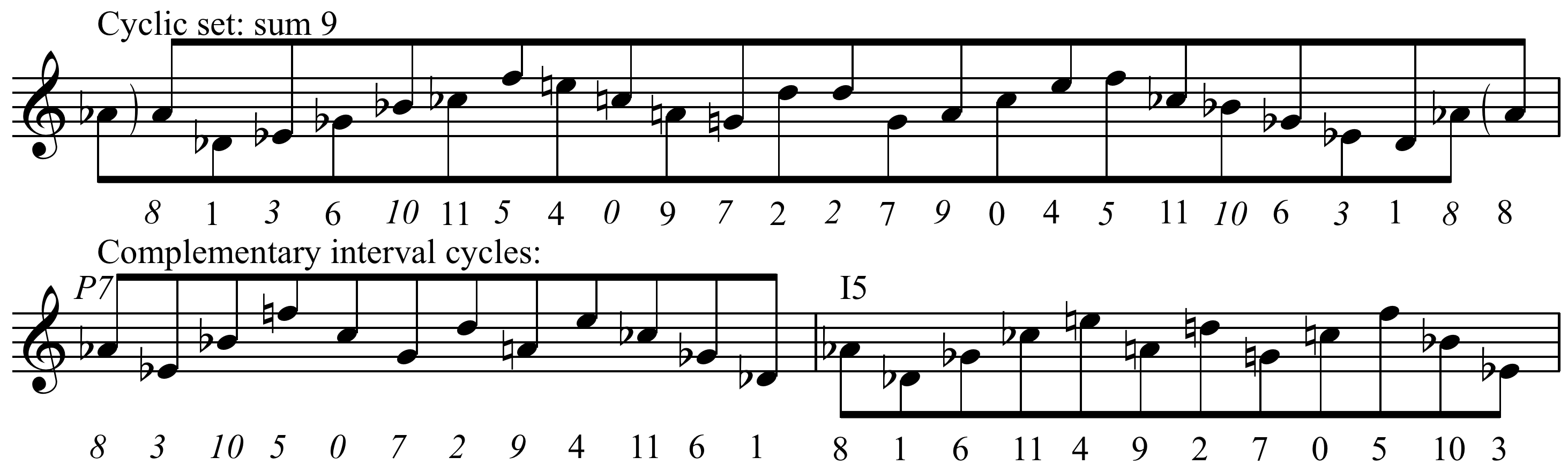
Cyclic set (sum 9) from Berg's Lyric Suite

In 1920 Berg discovered/created a "master array" of all twelve interval cycles:

     Berg's Master Array of Interval Cycles
Cycles P 0 11 10  9  8  7  6  5  4  3  2  1  0
 P  I  I 0  1  2  3  4  5  6  7  8  9 10 11  0
       _______________________________________
 0  0  | 0  0  0  0  0  0  0  0  0  0  0  0  0
11  1  | 0 11 10  9  8  7  6  5  4  3  2  1  0
10  2  | 0 10  8  6  4  2  0 10  8  6  4  2  0
 9  3  | 0  9  6  3  0  9  6  3  0  9  6  3  0
 8  4  | 0  8  4  0  8  4  0  8  4  0  8  4  0
 7  5  | 0  7  2  9  4 11  6  1  8  3 10  5  0
 6  6  | 0  6  0  6  0  6  0  6  0  6  0  6  0
 5  7  | 0  5 10  3  8  1  6 11  4  9  2  7  0
 4  8  | 0  4  8  0  4  8  0  4  8  0  4  8  0
 3  9  | 0  3  6  9  0  3  6  9  0  3  6  9  0
 2 10  | 0  2  4  6  8 10  0  2  4  6  8 10  0
 1 11  | 0  1  2  3  4  5  6  7  8  9 10 11  0
 0  0  | 0  0  0  0  0  0  0  0  0  0  0  0  0

== See also ==
- Equal-interval chord
- Identity (music)
- Interval vector
- Octatonic scale
