= Equivalence class (music) =

A perfect octave between two C's; equivalent but not identical
Enharmonic equivalence

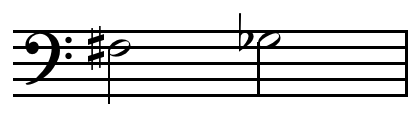
The notes F♯ and G♭ are enharmonic equivalents

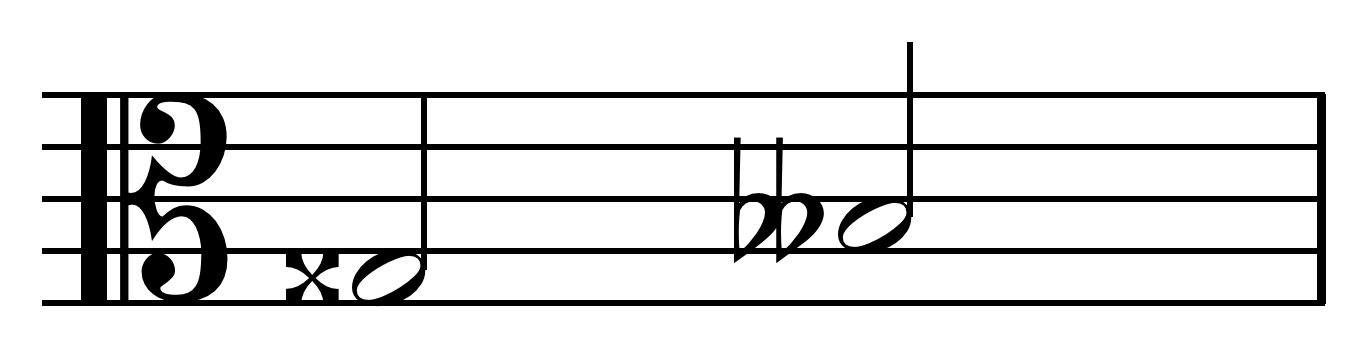
G and B are enharmonic equivalents, both the same as A♮

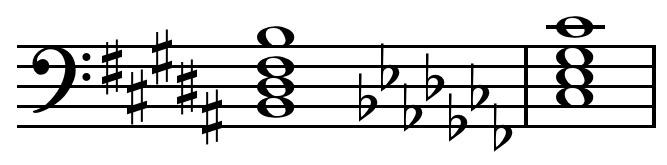
Enharmonically equivalent key signatures of B♮ and C♭ major, each followed by its respective tonic chord

In music theory, equivalence class is an equality (=) or equivalence between properties of sets (unordered) or twelve-tone rows (ordered sets). A relation rather than an operation, it may be contrasted with derivation. "It is not surprising that music theorists have different concepts of equivalence [from each other]..." "Indeed, an informal notion of equivalence has always been part of music theory and analysis. Pitch class set theory, however, has adhered to formal definitions of equivalence." Traditionally, octave equivalency is assumed, while inversional, permutational, and transpositional equivalency may or may not be considered (sequences and modulations are techniques of the common practice period which are based on transpositional equivalency; similarity within difference; unity within variety/variety within unity).

A definition of equivalence between two twelve-tone series that Schuijer describes as informal despite its air of mathematical precision, and that shows its writer considered equivalence and equality as synonymous:

Two sets [twelve-tone series], P and P′ will be considered equivalent [equal] if and only if, for any p_{i,j} of the first set and p′_{i′,j′} of the second set, for all is and js [order numbers and pitch class numbers], if i=i′, then j=j′. (= denotes numeral equality in the ordinary sense).

— Milton Babbitt, (1992). The Function of Set Structure in the Twelve-Tone System, 8-9, cited in

== Definitions of Equivalence ==
Allen Forte formalized a definition of equivalence for pitch-class sets in The Structure of Atonal Music, writing that “Two PC sets will be said to be equivalent if and only if they are reducible to the same prime form by transposition or by inversion followed by transposition.”

Forte’s “Prime-form equivalence” reduces each pitch-class set to an ordering that represents its most compact intervallic arrangement. Two sets are considered equivalent if they collapse into the same prime form, even if their original spacing or pitch ordering differs. For instance, the sets {0, 4, 7} and {5, 9, 11} both reduce to the prime form [0, 4, 7] and are thus members of the same equivalence class.

John Clough published a critique of Forte’s definition in 1965; while Clough agreed with the utility of interval-vector analysis and prime forms, he argued that Forte's method groups sets that were mathematically similar, but “significantly less similar” musically. Sets with the same prime form, but unrelated by transposition or inversion, would be treated as equivalent under Forte’s model while sounding obviously different.

As an alternative, Clough advocated for the use of IT equivalence (inversional/transpositional equivalence), in which two sets are equivalent only if one can be obtained from the other by transposition or inversion. He described this relation as “a simple, venerable concept of preeminent musical relevance,” arguing that IT equivalence preserves perceptual similarity by ensuring that members of an equivalence class share recognizable intervallic structure rather than only abstract interval counts.

== Contour Equivalence ==
In addition to pitch-class equivalence, definitions of melodic equivalence have developed. A contour is the ordered pattern of rises and falls in pitch, abstracted from the exact intervals or pitch classes (see Melodic motion). Two melodies are considered contour-equivalent if they share the same pattern of relative direction, even when they differ in their specific pitches or intervals. In Composition with Pitch Classes, John Roeder explains that “two contours transformationally related… are tokens of a single type, or equivalence class,” highlighting how contour relations can be grouped independently of pitch-class identity

Contour equivalence has been widely applied in the analysis of post-tonal and non-Western repertoire, where relative shape may be more perceptually salient than specific intervals. By abstracting away from pitch content, contour theory provides a flexible framework for comparing motives across transpositions, scales, and tuning systems. In this way, equivalence is defined not by prime form or interval vector, but by recurring directional patterns that organize melodic design.

== See also ==
- Enharmonic equivalency
- Identity (music)
- Invariance (music)
- Set theory (music)
- Similarity relation (music)
