= Transformation (music) =

Musical operation

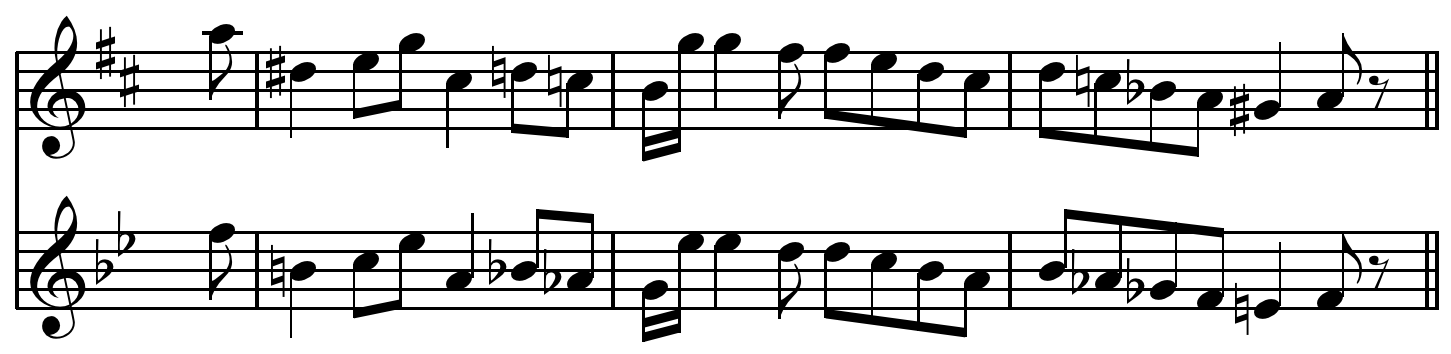
Transposition example from Koch. The melody on the first line is in the key of D, while the melody on the second line is identical except that it is major third lower, in the key of B♭.

In music, a transformation consists of any operation or process that may apply to a musical variable (usually a set or tone row in twelve tone music, or a melody or chord progression in tonal music), or rhythm in composition, performance, or analysis. Transformations include multiplication, rotation, permutation (i.e. transposition, inversion, and retrograde), prolation (augmentation, diminution) and combinations thereof.

Transformations may also be applied to simpler or more complex variables such as interval and spectrum or timbre.

== See also ==
- Developing variation
- Identity (music)
- Operation (music)
- Permutation (music)
- Transformational theory
