= Thematic transformation =

Thematic transformation (also known as thematic metamorphosis or thematic development) is a musical technique in which a leitmotif, or theme, is developed by changing the theme by using permutation (transposition or modulation, inversion, and retrograde), augmentation, diminution, and fragmentation. It was primarily developed by Franz Liszt and Hector Berlioz. The technique is essentially one of variation. A basic theme is reprised throughout a musical work, but it undergoes constant transformations and disguises and is made to appear in several contrasting roles. However, the transformations of this theme will always serve the purpose of "unity within variety" that was the architectural role of sonata form in the classical symphony. The difference here is that thematic transformation can accommodate the dramatically charged phrases, highly coloured melodies and atmospheric harmonies favored by the Romantic composers, whereas sonata form was geared more toward the more objective characteristics of absolute music. Also, while thematic transformation is similar to variation, the effect is usually different since the transformed theme has a life of its own and is no longer a sibling to the original theme.

== Development ==
Liszt was not the first composer to use thematic transformation. Ludwig van Beethoven had already used thematic transformation in his Fifth Symphony and Ninth Symphony, where the "Ode to Joy" theme is transformed at one point into a Turkish march, complete with cymbals and drums. Franz Schubert used metamorphosis to bind together the four movements of his Wanderer Fantasy, a work which influenced Liszt greatly. However, Liszt perfected the technique by creating entire structures from metamorphosis alone. He may have already had experience in metamorphosing themes into various shapes in his early operatic fantasies and improvisations and been also led to this practice by the monothematicism Liszt employed in many of his original works, including most of the Transcendental Etudes.

== Controversy ==
Conservative critics in Liszt's time viewed thematic transformation as merely a substitution of repetition for the musical development demanded by sonata form. However, the evocative, atmospheric melodies which Romantic composers such as Liszt tended to prefer left him little choice. These melodies, complete in themselves, already bore all the emotion and musical interest which they could hold; therefore, they could not be developed any further. The only apparent course open was to substitute a form of repetition for true development—in other words, to say in a different way what had already been said and trust the beauty and significance of what are fundamentally variations to supply the place of the development section demanded by sonata form. Moreover, Liszt's own view of repetition was more positive than that of his critics. He wrote, "It is a mistake to regard repetition as a poverty of invention. From the standpoint of the public it is indispensable for the understanding of the thought, while from the standpoint of Art it is almost identical with the demands of clarity, structure, and effectiveness."

== Legacy ==
In perfecting this compositional method, Liszt made what some critics consider a lasting contribution to the history of musical form since thematic transformation became a regular part of later 19th-century music, especially at the hands of Liszt's followers. Liszt authority Humphrey Searle points out that "the serial methods of Schönberg, for instance, use precisely the methods of Liszt's thematic transformation within the framework of an entirely different [musical] language." Richard Wagner and Gustav Holst heavily used thematic transformation in their compositions.

== See also ==
- Leitmotif
- Hector Berlioz
- Johannes Brahms
- Antonín Dvořák
- Permutation (music)
- Transposition (music)
- Modulation (music)
- Inversion (music)
- Retrograde (music)
- Augmentation (music)
- Diminution
- Fragmentation (music)
- Faust Symphony
- Piano Sonata (Liszt)
- Symphonic Poems (Liszt)

== Bibliography ==
- Cooper, Martin, ed. Gerald Abraham, "The Symphonies", Music of Tchaikovsky (New York: W. W. Norton & Company, 1946). ISBN n/a.
- MacDonald, Hugh, ed Sadie, Stanley, "Symphonic poem", The New Grove Dictionary of Music and Musicians, First Edition (London: Macmillan, 1980). ISBN 0-333-23111-2
- Reti, Rudolph, The Thematic Process in Music. (New York: Macmillan, 1951). ISBN 0-8371-9875-5
- MacDonald, Hugh, ed Stanley Sadie, "Transformation, thematic", The New Grove Dictionary of Music and Musicians, Second Edition (London: Macmillan, 2001). ISBN 0-333-60800-3
- Searle, Humphrey, The Music of Liszt, Second Revised Edition (New York: Dover Publications, Inc., 1966). Library of Congress Catalog Number 66-27581.
- Searle, Humphrey, ed. Alan Walker, "The Orchestral Works", Franz Liszt: The Man and His Music (New York: Taplinger Publishing Company, 1970). ISBN 0-8008-2990-5
- Searle, Humphrey, ed. Stanley Sadie, "Liszt, Franz", The New Grove Dictionary of Music and Musicians, First Edition (London: Macmillan, 1980). ISBN 0-333-23111-2
- Walker, Alan, Franz Liszt, Volume 2: The Weimar Years, 1848-1861 (New York: Alfred A Knopf, 1989). ISBN 0-394-52540-X
