= Tone row =

Sequence of all twelve chromatic tones

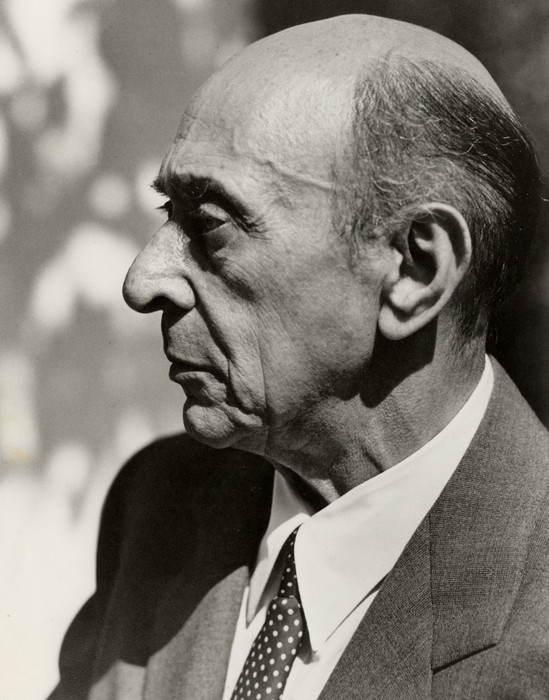
Arnold Schoenberg, inventor of the twelve-tone technique

In music, a tone row or note row (German: Reihe or Tonreihe), also series or set, is a non-repetitive ordering of a set of pitch-classes, typically of the twelve notes in musical set theory of the chromatic scale, though both larger and smaller sets are sometimes found.

== History and usage ==
Tone rows are the basis of Arnold Schoenberg's twelve-tone technique and most types of serial music. Tone rows were widely used in 20th-century contemporary music, like Dmitri Shostakovich's use of twelve-tone rows, "without dodecaphonic transformations."

A tone row has been identified in the A-minor prelude, BWV 889, from Book II of J.S. Bach's The Well-Tempered Clavier (1742). It is also found in works such as Mozart's String Quartet in C, K. 157 (1772), String Quartet in E♭, K. 428, String Quintet in G minor, K. 516 (1790), and the Symphony No. 40, K. 550 (1788). A passage from Symphony No. 40 is shown below in which every tone in the chromatic scale is played except for G (the tonic):

Beethoven also used the technique but, on the whole, "Mozart seems to have employed serial technique far more often than Beethoven". Franz Liszt used a twelve-tone row in the opening of his Faust Symphony. Hans Keller claims that Schoenberg was aware of this serial practice in the classical period and that "Schoenberg repressed his knowledge of classical serialism because it would have injured his narcissism."

== Theory and compositional techniques ==
Tone rows are designated by letters and subscript numbers (e.g.: RI_{11}, which may also appear as RI11 or RI–11). The numbers indicate the initial (P or I) or final (R or RI) pitch-class number of the given row form, most often with c = 0.

- "P" indicates prime, a forward-directed, right-side-up form.
- "I" indicates inversion, a forward-directed, upside-down form.
- "R" indicates retrograde, a backwards, right-side-up form.
- "RI" indicates retrograde-inversion, a backwards, upside-down form.
- Transposition is indicated by a T number, for example P8 is a T(4) transposition of P4.

A twelve-tone composition will take one or more tone rows, called the "prime form", as its basis plus their transformations (inversion, retrograde, retrograde inversion, as well as transposition). These forms may be used to construct a melody in a straightforward manner as in the fifth movement from Schoenberg's Piano Suite, Op. 25, where P-0 is used to construct the opening melody and later varied through transposition, as P-6, and also in articulation and dynamics. It is then varied again through inversion, untransposed, taking form I-0. However, rows may be combined to produce melodies or harmonies in more complicated ways, such as taking successive or multiple pitches of a melody from two different row forms.

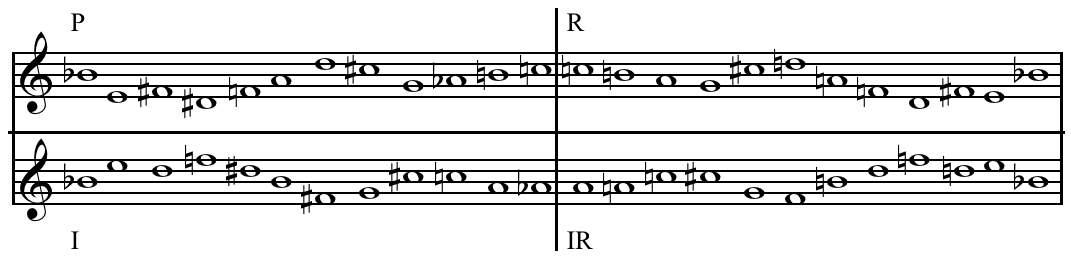
"Mirror forms", P, R, I, and RI, of a tone row (from Arnold Schoenberg's Variations for Orchestra, Op. 31, "Called mirror forms because... they are identical".

Initially, Schoenberg required the avoidance of suggestions of tonality—such as the use of consecutive imperfect consonances (thirds or sixths)—when constructing tone rows, reserving such use for the time when the dissonance is completely emancipated. Alban Berg, however, sometimes incorporated tonal elements into his twelve-tone works. The main tone row of his Violin Concerto hints at this tonality:

This tone row consists of alternating minor and major triads starting on the open strings of the violin, followed by a portion of an ascending whole-tone scale. This whole-tone scale reappears in the second movement when the chorale "Es ist genug" ("It is enough") from J.S. Bach's cantata O Ewigkeit, du Donnerwort, BWV 60 is quoted literally in the woodwinds (mostly clarinet).

Some tone rows have a high degree of internal organization. An example is the tone row from Anton Webern's Concerto for Nine Instruments Op. 24, shown below.

In this tone row, if the first three notes are regarded as the "original" cell, then the next three are its retrograde inversion, the next three are retrograde, and the last three are its inversion. A row created in this manner, through variants of a trichord or tetrachord called the generator, is called a derived row.

The tone rows of many of Webern's other late works are similarly intricate. The tone row for Webern's String Quartet, Op. 28 is based on the BACH motif (B♭, A, C, B♮) and is composed of three tetrachords:

The "set-complex" is the forty-eight forms of the set generated by stating each "aspect" or transformation on each pitch class.

The all-interval twelve-tone row is a tone row arranged so that it contains one instance of each interval within the octave, 0 through 11.

The "total chromatic" (or "aggregate") is the set of all twelve pitch classes. An "array" is a succession of aggregates. The term is also used to refer to lattices.

An aggregate may be achieved through complementation or combinatoriality, such as with hexachords.

A "secondary set" is a tone row which is derived from or, "results from the reversed coupling of hexachords", when a given row form is immediately repeated. For example, the row form consisting of two hexachords:

   0 1 2 3 4 5 / 6 7 8 9 t e

when repeated immediately results in the following succession of two aggregates, in the middle of which is a new and complete aggregate beginning with the second hexachord:

   0 1 2 3 4 5 / 6 7 8 9 t e / 0 1 2 3 4 5 / 6 7 8 9 t e
secondary set: [6 7 8 9 t e / 0 1 2 3 4 5]

A "weighted aggregate" is an aggregate in which the twelfth pitch does not appear until at least one pitch has appeared at least twice, supplied by segments of different set forms. It seems to have been first used in Milton Babbitt's String Quartet No. 4. An aggregate may be vertically or horizontally weighted. An "all-partition array" is created by combining a collection of hexachordally combinatorial arrays.

== Examples ==
The principal forms of the tone row of Anton Webern's Variations for piano, Op. 27 are shown below. In this tone row, each hexachord fills in a chromatic fourth, with B as the pivot (end of P1 and beginning of IR8), and thus linked by the prominent tritone in the center of the row.

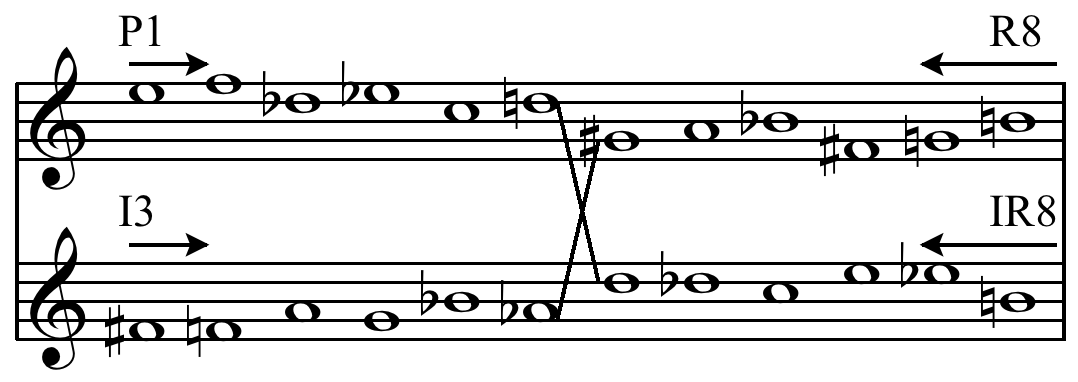

The first array of four aggregates (numbered 1–4 at bottom) from Milton Babbitt's Composition for Four Instruments are shown. In this row, each vertical line (four trichords labeled a–d) is an aggregate while each horizontal line (four trichords labeled a–d) is also an aggregate

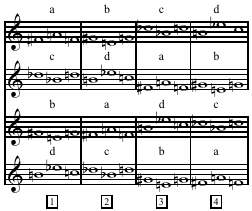

Shown below is the tone row for Karlheinz Stockhausen's Gruppen für drei Orchester. Here, the registrally-fixed pitches correspond to duration units and metronome marks.

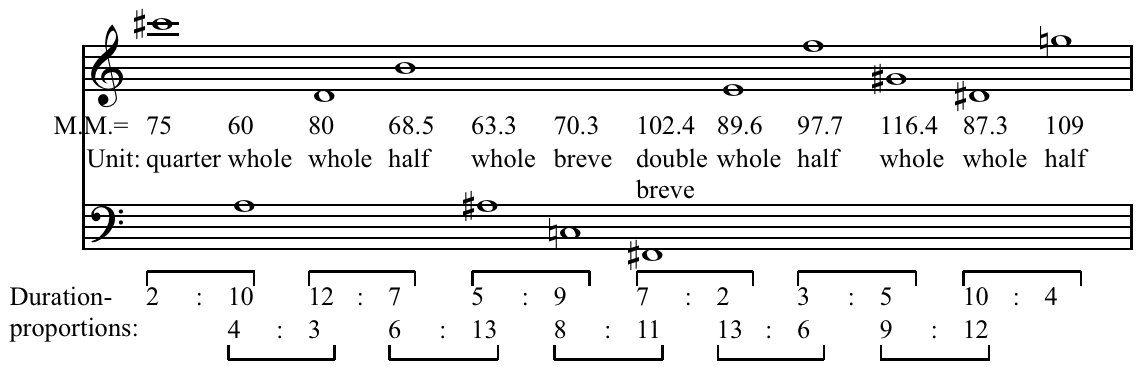

=== Nonstandard tone rows ===
Schoenberg specified many strict rules and desirable guidelines for the construction of tone rows such as number of notes and intervals to avoid. Tone rows that depart from these guidelines include the above tone row from Berg's Violin Concerto which contains triads and tonal emphasis, and the tone row below from Luciano Berio's Nones which contains a repeated note making it a 'thirteen-tone row':

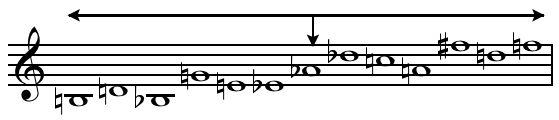
Thirteen-note tone row from Luciano Berio's Nones, symmetrical about the central tone with one note (D) repeated.

Igor Stravinsky used a five-tone row, chromatically filling out the space of a major third centered tonally on C (C–E), in one of his early serial compositions, In memoriam Dylan Thomas.

In his twelve-tone practice, Stravinsky preferred the inverse-retrograde (IR) to the retrograde-inverse (RI), as for example in his Requiem Canticles:

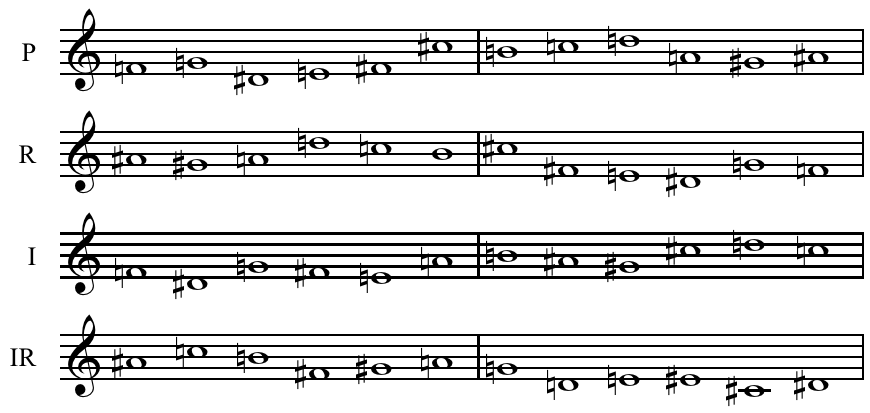
Basic row forms from Stravinsky's Requiem Canticles: P, R, I, and IR

Ben Johnston uses a "just tone row" (see just intonation) in works including String Quartets Nos. 6 and 7. Each permutation contains a just chromatic scale, however, transformations (transposition and inversion) produce pitches outside of the primary row form, as already occurs in the inversion of P0. The pitches of each hexachord are drawn from different otonality or utonality on A+ utonality, C otonality and utonality, and E♭- otonality, outlining a diminished triad.

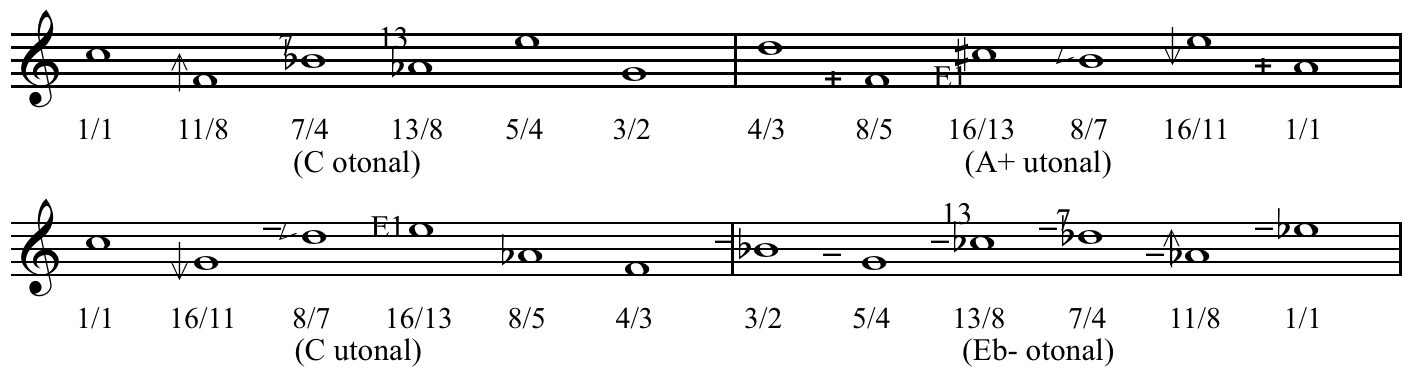
Primary forms of the just tone row from Ben Johnston's String Quartet No. 7, mov. 2 and hexachords.

== See also ==
- Musical set theory
- Unified field
- Side-slipping
- Pitch interval
- List of tone rows and series
