= Similarity relation (music) =

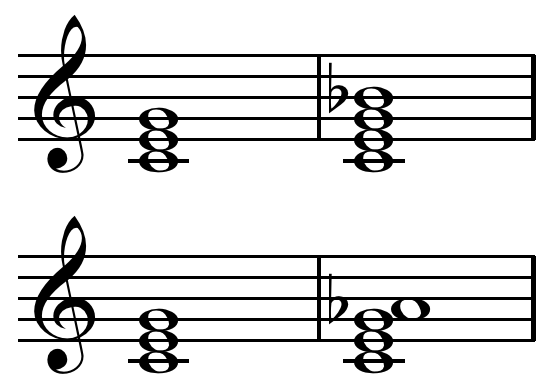
Similarity relation. 047 followed by 047t and 0478, respectively. 047t and 0478 are in the relation R_{p}, as they are with ten other sets.

In music, a similarity relation or pitch-class similarity is a comparison between sets of the same cardinality (two sets containing the same number of pitch classes), based upon shared pitch class and/or interval class content.

Allen Forte originally designated four types: R_{p} (maximal similarity with respect to pitch class), R_{0} (minimal similarity), R_{1} (first order maximal similarity), and R_{2} (second order maximal similarity). In R_{p} one pitch class is different, in R_{0} all are different, and in R_{1} and R_{2} four interval classes are the same.

Rp is defined for sets S_{1} and S_{2} of cardinal number n and S_{3} of cardinal number n-1 as:

R_{p}(S_{1},S_{2}) iff (S_{3} ⊂ S_{1}, S_{3} ⊂ S_{2})

Meaning that S_{1} and S_{2} each have all the pitch-classes of S_{3} (transposed or inverted), plus one.

[T]he pc similarity relation R_{p} is not especially significant when taken alone, since by that measure a given set may be similar to many others. When R_{p} is combined with the [interval-class] similarity measures, however, a considerable reduction is effected.

— Allen Forte

== See also ==
- Equivalence class (music)
