= Set theory (music) =

Branch of music theory

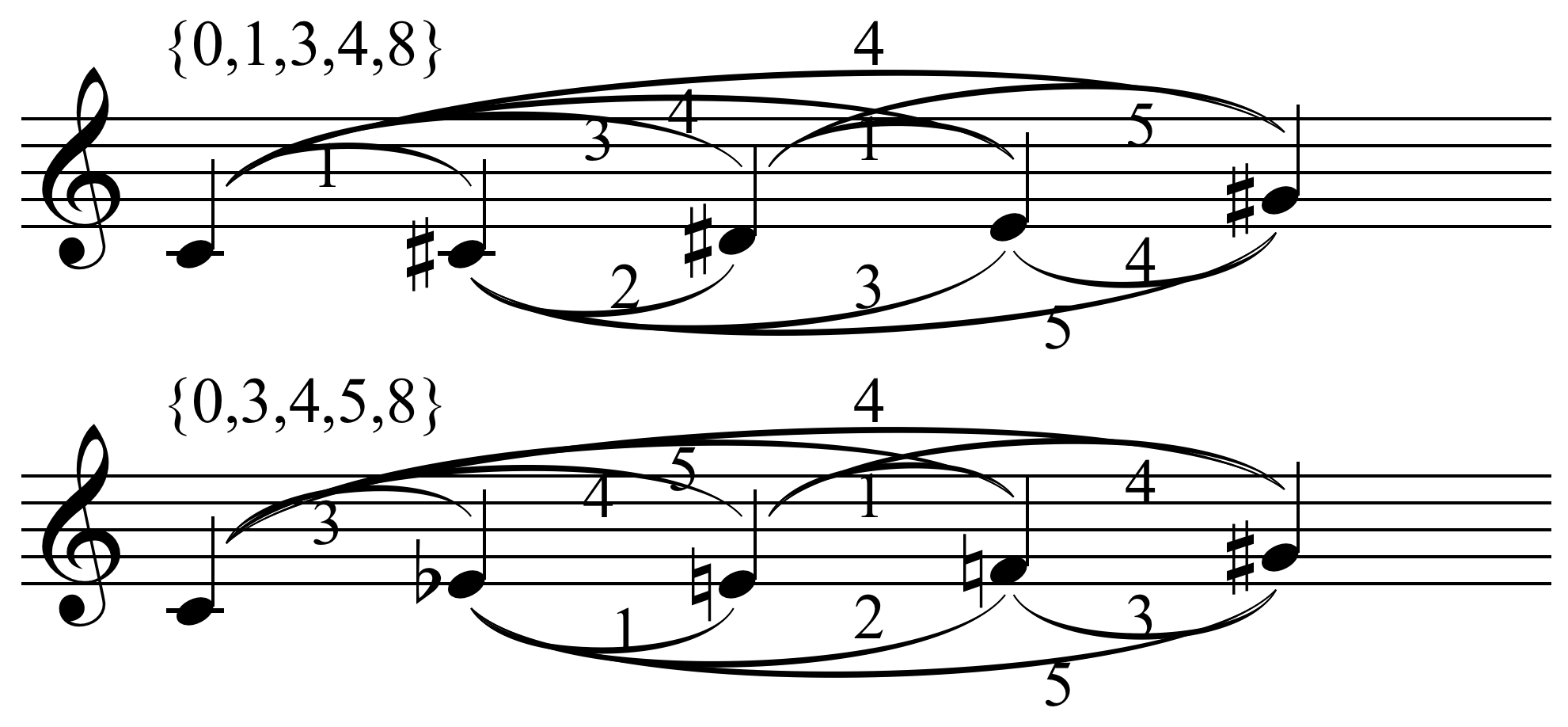
Example of Z-relation on two pitch sets analyzable as or derivable from Z17, with intervals between pitch classes labeled for ease of comparison between the two sets and their common interval vector, 212320

Musical set theory provides concepts for categorizing musical objects and describing their relationships. Howard Hanson first elaborated many of the concepts for analyzing tonal music. Other theorists, such as Allen Forte, further developed the theory for analyzing atonal music, drawing on the twelve-tone theory of Milton Babbitt. The concepts of musical set theory are very general and can be applied to tonal and atonal styles in any equal temperament tuning system, and to some extent more generally than that.

One branch of musical set theory deals with collections (sets and permutations) of pitches and pitch classes (pitch-class set theory), which may be ordered or unordered, and can be related by musical operations such as transposition, melodic inversion, and complementation. Some theorists apply the methods of musical set theory to the analysis of rhythm as well.

== Comparison with mathematical set theory ==
Although musical set theory is often thought to involve the application of mathematical set theory to music, there are numerous differences between the methods and terminology of the two. For example, musicians use the terms transposition and inversion where mathematicians would use translation and reflection. Furthermore, where musical set theory refers to ordered sets, mathematics would normally refer to tuples or sequences (though mathematics does speak of ordered sets, and although these can be seen to include the musical kind in some sense, they are far more involved).

Moreover, musical set theory is more closely related to group theory and combinatorics than to mathematical set theory, which concerns itself with such matters as, for example, various sizes of infinitely large sets. In combinatorics, an unordered subset of n objects, such as pitch classes, is called a combination, and an ordered subset a permutation. Musical set theory is better regarded as an application of combinatorics to music theory than as a branch of mathematical set theory. Its main connection to mathematical set theory is the use of the vocabulary of set theory to talk about finite sets.

== Types of sets ==
The fundamental concept of musical set theory is the (musical) set, which is an unordered collection of pitch classes. More exactly, a pitch-class set is a numerical representation consisting of distinct integers (i.e., without duplicates). The elements of a set may be manifested in music as simultaneous chords, successive tones (as in a melody), or both. Notational conventions vary from author to author, but sets are typically enclosed in curly braces: {}, or square brackets: [].

Some theorists use angle brackets ⟨ ⟩ to denote ordered sequences, while others distinguish ordered sets by separating the numbers with spaces. Thus one might notate the unordered set of pitch classes 0, 1, and 2 (corresponding in this case to C, C♯, and D) as {0,1,2}. The ordered sequence C-C♯-D would be notated ⟨0,1,2⟩ or (0,1,2). Although C is considered zero in this example, this is not always the case. For example, a piece (whether tonal or atonal) with a clear pitch center of F might be most usefully analyzed with F set to zero (in which case {0,1,2} would represent F, F♯ and G. (For the use of numbers to represent notes, see pitch class.)

Though set theorists usually consider sets of equal-tempered pitch classes, it is possible to consider sets of pitches, non-equal-tempered pitch classes, rhythmic onsets, or "beat classes".

Two-element sets are called dyads, three-element sets trichords (occasionally "triads", though this is easily confused with the traditional meaning of the word triad). Sets of higher cardinalities are called tetrachords (or tetrads), pentachords (or pentads), hexachords (or hexads), heptachords (heptads or, sometimes, mixing Latin and Greek roots, "septachords"—e.g. Rahn), octachords (octads), nonachords (nonads), decachords (decads), undecachords, and, finally, the dodecachord.

== Basic operations ==
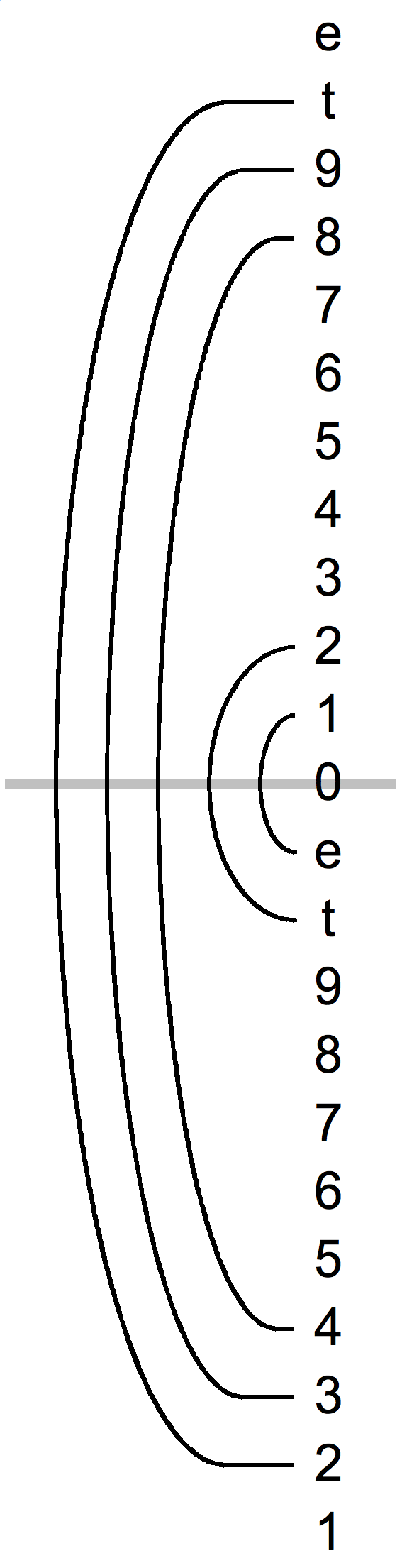
Pitch class inversion: 234te reflected around 0 to become t9821

The basic operations that may be performed on a set are transposition and inversion. Sets related by transposition or inversion are said to be transpositionally related or inversionally related, and to belong to the same set class. Since transposition and inversion are isometries of pitch-class space, they preserve the intervallic structure of a set, even if they do not preserve the musical character of the elements of the set. This can be considered the central postulate of musical set theory. In practice, set-theoretic musical analysis often consists in the identification of non-obvious transpositional or inversional relationships between sets found in a piece.

Some authors consider the operations of complementation and multiplication as well. The complement of set X is the set consisting of all the pitch classes not contained in X. The product of two pitch classes is the product of their pitch-class numbers modulo 12. Since complementation and multiplication are not isometries of pitch-class space, they do not necessarily preserve the musical character of the objects they transform. Other writers, such as Allen Forte, have emphasized the Z-relation, which obtains between two sets that share the same total interval content, or interval vector—but are not transpositionally or inversionally equivalent. Another name for this relationship, used by Hanson, is "isomeric".

Operations on ordered sequences of pitch classes also include transposition and inversion, as well as retrograde and rotation. Retrograding an ordered sequence reverses the order of its elements. Rotation of an ordered sequence is equivalent to cyclic permutation.

Transposition and inversion can be represented as elementary arithmetic operations. If x is a number representing a pitch class, its transposition by n semitones is written T_{n} = x + n mod 12. Inversion corresponds to reflection around some fixed point in pitch class space. If x is a pitch class, the inversion with index number n is written I_{n} = n - x mod 12.

== Equivalence relation ==
"For a relation in set S to be an equivalence relation [in algebra], it has to satisfy three conditions: it has to be reflexive ..., symmetrical ..., and transitive ...". "Indeed, an informal notion of equivalence has always been part of music theory and analysis. PC set theory, however, has adhered to formal definitions of equivalence."

== Transpositional and inversional set classes ==
Two transpositionally related sets are said to belong to the same transpositional set class (T_{n}). Two sets related by transposition or inversion are said to belong to the same transpositional/inversional set class (inversion being written T_{n}I or I_{n}). Sets belonging to the same transpositional set class are very similar-sounding; while sets belonging to the same transpositional/inversional set class could include two chords of the same type but in different keys, which would be less similar in sound but obviously still a bounded category. Because of this, music theorists often consider set classes basic objects of musical interest.

There are two main conventions for naming equal-tempered set classes. One, known as the Forte number, derives from Allen Forte, whose The Structure of Atonal Music (1973), is one of the first works in musical set theory. Forte provided each set class with a number of the form c–d, where c indicates the cardinality of the set and d is the ordinal number. Thus the chromatic trichord {0, 1, 2} belongs to set-class 3–1, indicating that it is the first three-note set class in Forte's list. The augmented trichord {0, 4, 8}, receives the label 3–12, which happens to be the last trichord in Forte's list.

The primary criticisms of Forte's nomenclature are: (1) Forte's labels are arbitrary and difficult to memorize, and it is in practice often easier simply to list an element of the set class; (2) Forte's system assumes equal temperament and cannot easily be extended to include diatonic sets, pitch sets (as opposed to pitch-class sets), multisets or sets in other tuning systems; (3) Forte's original system considers inversionally related sets to belong to the same set-class. This means that, for example a major triad and a minor triad are considered the same set.

Western tonal music for centuries has regarded major and minor, as well as chord inversions, as significantly different. They generate indeed completely different physical objects. Ignoring the physical reality of sound is an obvious limitation of atonal theory. However, the defense has been made that theory was not created to fill a vacuum in which existing theories inadequately explained tonal music. Rather, Forte's theory is used to explain atonal music, where the composer has invented a system where the distinction between {0, 4, 7} (called 'major' in tonal theory) and its inversion {0, 3, 7} (called 'minor' in tonal theory) may not be relevant.

The second notational system labels sets in terms of their normal form, which depends on the concept of normal order. To put a set in normal order, order it as an ascending scale in pitch-class space that spans less than an octave. Then permute it cyclically until its first and last notes are as close together as possible. In the case of ties, minimize the distance between the first and next-to-last note. (In case of ties here, minimize the distance between the first and next-to-next-to-last note, and so on.) Thus {0, 7, 4} in normal order is {0, 4, 7}, while {0, 2, 10} in normal order is {10, 0, 2}. To put a set in normal form, begin by putting it in normal order, and then transpose it so that its first pitch class is 0. Mathematicians and computer scientists most often order combinations using either alphabetical ordering, binary (base two) ordering, or Gray coding, each of which lead to differing but logical normal forms.

Since transpositionally related sets share the same normal form, normal forms can be used to label the T_{n} set classes.

To identify a set's T_{n}/I_{n} set class:

- Identify the set's T_{n} set class.
- Invert the set and find the inversion's T_{n} set class.
- Compare these two normal forms to see which is most "left packed."

The resulting set labels the initial set's T_{n}/I_{n} set class.

== Symmetries ==
The number of distinct operations in a system that map a set into itself is the set's degree of symmetry. The degree of symmetry, "specifies the number of operations that preserve the unordered pcsets of a partition; it tells the extent to which that partition's pitch-class sets map into (or onto) each other under transposition or inversion". Every set has at least one symmetry, as it maps onto itself under the identity operation T_{0}. Transpositionally symmetric sets map onto themselves for T_{n} where n does not equal 0 (mod 12). Inversionally symmetric sets map onto themselves under T_{n}I. For any given T_{n}/T_{n}I type all sets have the same degree of symmetry. The number of distinct sets in a type is 24 (the total number of operations, transposition and inversion, for n = 0 through 11) divided by the degree of symmetry of T_{n}/T_{n}I type.

Transpositionally symmetrical sets either divide the octave evenly, or can be written as the union of equally sized sets that themselves divide the octave evenly. Inversionally symmetrical chords are invariant under reflections in pitch class space. This means that the chords can be ordered cyclically so that the series of intervals between successive notes is the same read forward or backward. For instance, in the cyclical ordering (0, 1, 2, 7), the interval between the first and second note is 1, the interval between the second and third note is 1, the interval between the third and fourth note is 5, and the interval between the fourth note and the first note is 5.

One obtains the same sequence if one starts with the third element of the series and moves backward: the interval between the third element of the series and the second is 1; the interval between the second element of the series and the first is 1; the interval between the first element of the series and the fourth is 5; and the interval between the last element of the series and the third element is 5. Symmetry is therefore found between T_{0} and T_{2}I, and there are 12 sets in the T_{n}/T_{n}I equivalence class.

== See also ==
- Identity (music)
- Pitch interval
- Tonnetz
- Transformational theory
