= Simultaneity (music) =

In music, a simultaneity is more than one complete musical texture occurring at the same time, rather than in succession. This first appeared in the music of Charles Ives, and is common in the music of Conlon Nancarrow and others.

== Types ==
In music theory, a pitch simultaneity is more than one pitch or pitch class all of which occur at the same time, or simultaneously: "A set of notes sounded together." Simultaneity is a more specific and more general term than chord: many but not all chords or harmonies are simultaneities, though not all but some simultaneities are chords. For example, arpeggios are chords whose tones are not simultaneous. "The practice of harmony typically involves both simultaneity...and linearity."

A simultaneity succession is a series of different groups of pitches or pitch classes, each of which is played at the same time as the other pitches of its group. Thus, a simultaneity succession is a succession of simultaneities.

Similarly, simultaneity succession is a more general term than chord progression or harmonic progression: most chord progressions or harmonic progressions are then simultaneity successions, though not all simultaneity successions are harmonic progressions and not all simultaneities are chords.

== See also ==
- Musical set theory
- Polyphony
- Counterpoint
