= Pitch-class interval =

In music, pitch-class interval may refer to:

- ordered pitch-class interval
- unordered pitch-class interval
