= Identity (music) =

Musical transformation that maps an entity onto itself

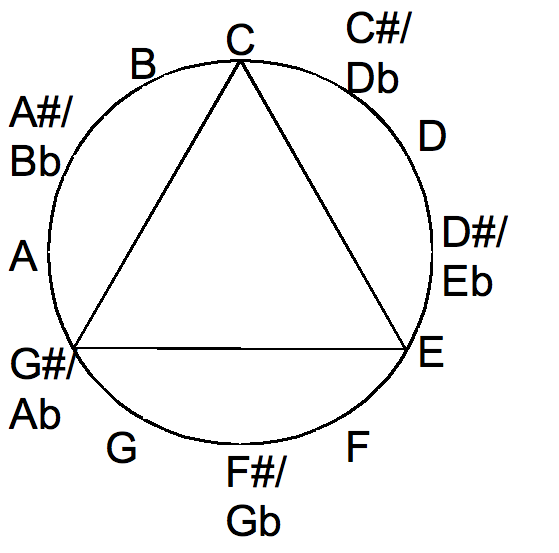
048 equals itself when transposed by 4 or 8 or when inverted

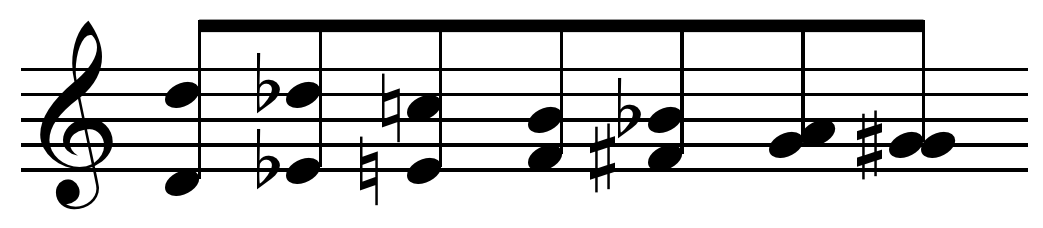
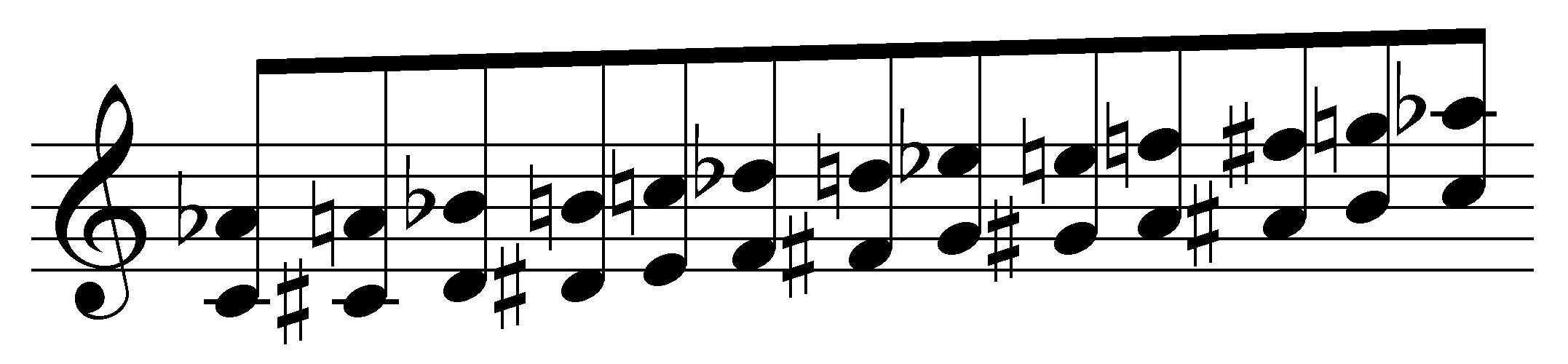
Sum-4 family and interval-4 family
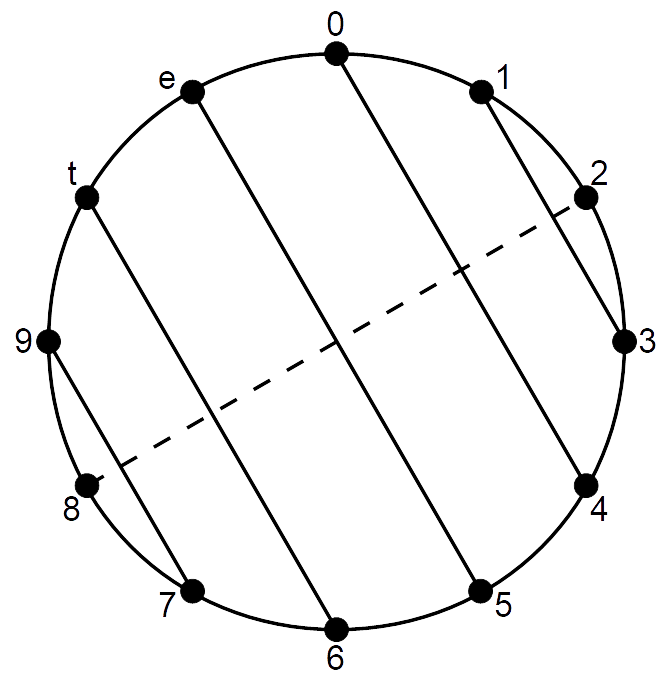
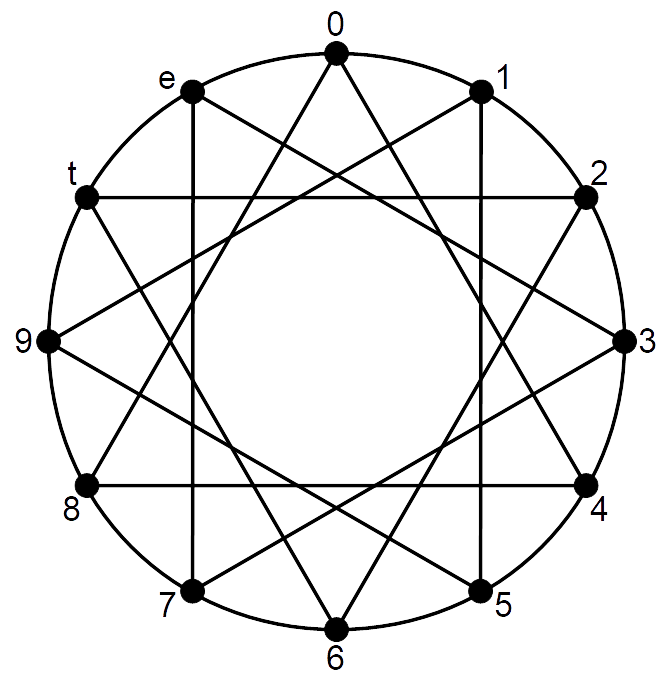
Sum-4 family and interval-4 family in the chromatic circle, symmetry easily seen
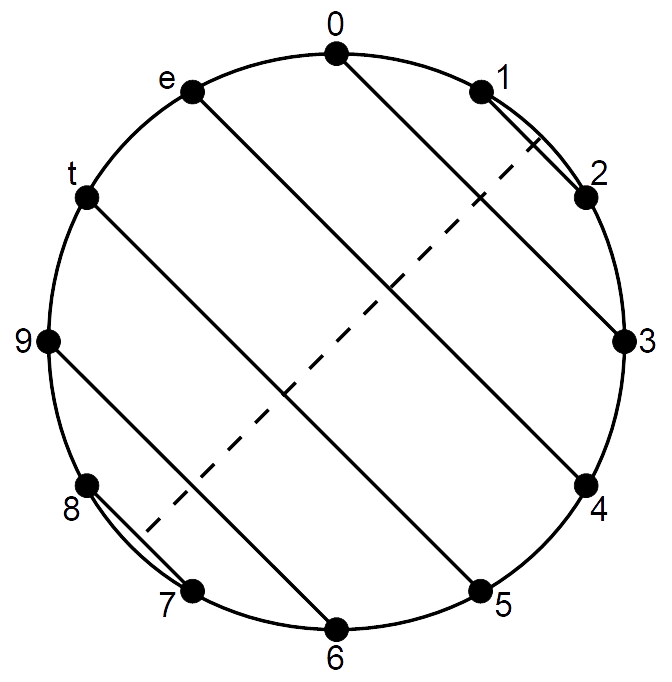
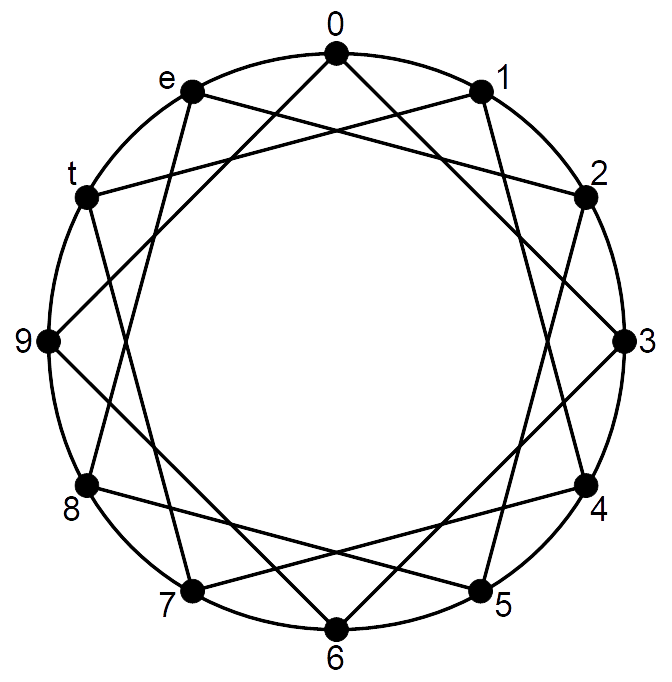
Sum-3 family and interval-3 family for comparison

In post-tonal music theory, identity is similar to identity in universal algebra. An identity function is a permutation or transformation which transforms a pitch or pitch class set into itself. Generally this requires symmetry. For instance, inverting an augmented triad or C4 interval cycle, 048, produces itself. Performing a retrograde operation upon the tone row 01210 produces 01210. Doubling the length of a rhythm while doubling the tempo produces a rhythm of the same durations as the original.

In addition to being a property of a specific set, identity is, by extension, the "family" of sets or set forms which satisfy a possible identity. These families are defined by symmetry, which means that an object is invariant to any of various transformations; including reflection and rotation.

George Perle provides the following example:

"C-E, D-F♯, E♭-G, are different instances of the same interval [interval-4]...[an] other kind of identity...has to do with axes of symmetry [reflection symmetry rather than interval families' rotational symmetry]. C-E belongs to a family [sum-4] of symmetrically related dyads as follows:"

	D	C♯	C	B	A♯	A	G♯
	D	D♯	E	F	F♯	G	G♯
	2	1	0	e	9	8	7
+	2	3	4	5	6	7	8
	4	4	4	4	4	4	4

C=0, so in mod12, the interval-4 family:

	C	C♯	D	D♯	E	F	F♯	G	G♯	A	A♯	B
	G♯	A	A♯	B	C	C♯	D	D♯	E	F	F♯	G
	0	1	2	3	4	5	6	7	8	9	t	e
−	8	9	10	11	0	1	2	3	4	5	6	7
	4	4	4	4	4	4	4	4	4	4	4	4

Thus, in addition to being part of the sum-4 family, C-E is also a part of the interval-4 family (in contrast to sum families, interval families are based on difference).

== See also ==
- Klumpenhouwer network
- Point reflection
- Derived row
- Twelve-tone technique#Invariance
