= Nones (Berio) =

1954 orchestral composition by Luciano Berio

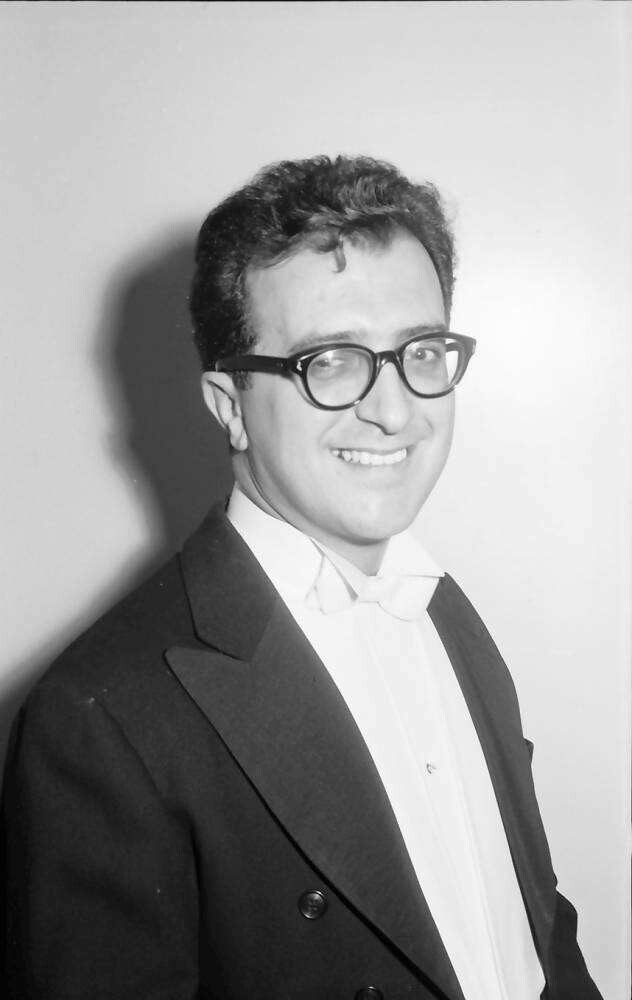
Luciano Berio in Darmstadt, in 1959

Nones (1954) is a composition by Luciano Berio scored for orchestra. The piece is named for the poem, "Nones", by W. H. Auden, and was originally intended to be an oratorio, inspired by the poem, representing not only the Passion of Christ, but also the agony of modern man. The purely instrumental piece is predominantly punctual in texture and formally consists of an approximate arch created by "theme" and variations.

The tone row used was nontraditional in construction in several respects including number of pitches and consistent emphasis on intervals of major and minor thirds. A note in Berio's sketches confirms that he consciously derived it from the trichordal cell of Webern's Concerto, Op. 24, which it strongly resembles. Its combination of major and minor thirds is also prevalent in Stravinsky, who had been a strong influence on Berio up to this time.

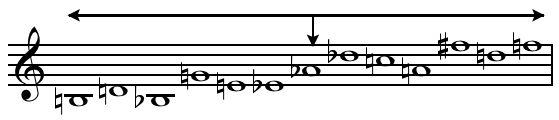
Thirteen-note tone row from Nones, symmetrical about the central tone with one note (D) repeated

Webern's tone row for the Concerto, Op. 24,
from which Berio derived the row for Nones

Berio's row is symmetrical around the central A♭, and each trichordal segment of the hexachords flanking that central note contains both the minor and major third. The row in fact includes four of the six possible permutations of this core trichord, guaranteeing a permanent atonal equilibrium.
