= Emancipation of the dissonance =

Musical concept by Arnold Schoenberg

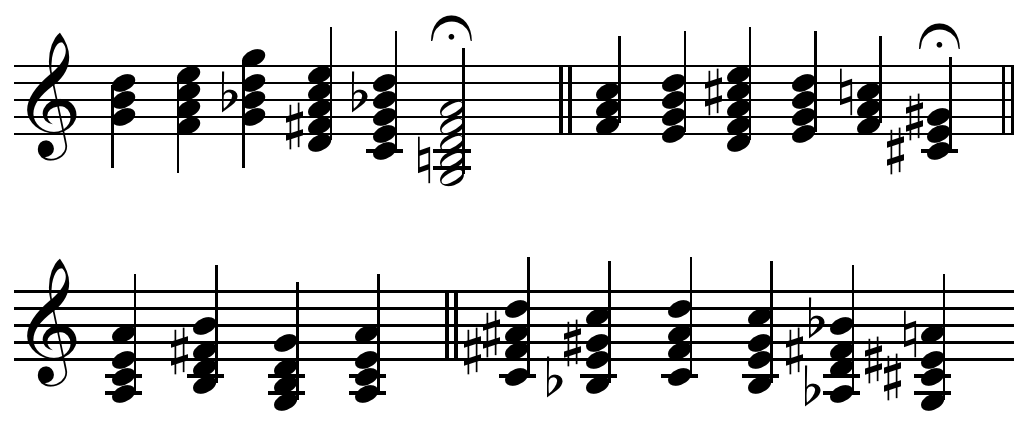
Chords, featuring chromatically altered sevenths and ninths and progressing unconventionally, explored by Debussy in a "celebrated conversation at the piano with his teacher Ernest Guiraud" (Lockspeiser 1962, 207).

The emancipation of the dissonance was a concept or goal put forth by composer Arnold Schoenberg and others, including his pupil Anton Webern, who styled it The Path to the New Music. The phrase first appears in Schoenberg's 1926 essay "Opinion or Insight?". It may be described as a metanarrative to justify atonality. The musicologist Jim Samson describes:

As the ear becomes acclimatized to a sonority within a particular context, the sonority will gradually become 'emancipated' from that context and seek a new one. The emancipation of the dominant-quality dissonances has followed this pattern, with the dominant seventh developing in status from a contrapuntal note in the sixteenth century to a quasi-consonant harmonic note in the early nineteenth. By the later nineteenth century the higher numbered dominant-quality dissonances had also achieved harmonic status, with resolution delayed or omitted completely. The greater autonomy of the dominant-quality dissonance contributed significantly to the weakening of traditional tonal function within a purely diatonic context.

== Overview ==
Composers such as Charles Ives, Dane Rudhyar, Duke Ellington, and Lou Harrison connected the emancipation of the dissonance with the emancipation of society and humanity. Michael Broyles calls Ives' tone-cluster-rich song "Majority" as "an incantation, a mystical statement of belief in the masses or the people". Duke Ellington, after playing some of his pieces for a journalist, said, "That's the Negro's life ... Hear that chord! Dissonance is our way of life in America. We are something apart, yet an integral part". Lou Harrison described Carl Ruggles's counterpoint as "a community of singing lines, living a life of its own, . . . careful not to get ahead or behind in its rhythmic cooperation with the others". Rudhyar gave the subtitle "A New Principle of Musical and Social Organization" to his book Dissonant Harmony, writing, "Dissonant music is thus the music of true and spiritual Democracy; the music of universal brotherhoods; music of Free Souls, not of personalities. It abolishes tonalities, exactly as the real Buddhistic Reformation abolished castes into the Brotherhood of Monks; for Buddhism is nothing but spiritual Democracy".

Just as the harmonic series was and is used as a justification for consonance, such as by Rameau, among others, the harmonic series is often used as physical or psychoacoustic justification for the gradual emancipation of intervals and chords found further and further up the harmonic series over time, such as is argued by Henry Cowell in defense of his tone clusters. Some argue further that they are not dissonances, but consonances higher up the harmonic series and thus more complex. The musicologist Jacques Chailley, cited by Jean-Jacques Nattiez, gives the following diagram, a specific timeline he proposes:

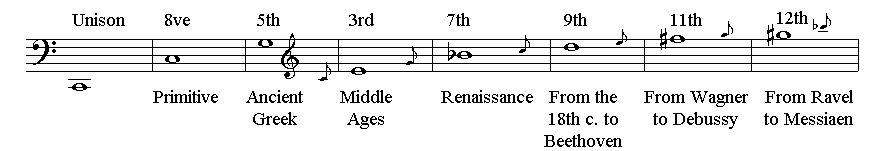
Timeline of the "emancipation of the dissonance": unison, octave, perfect fifth, major third, minor seventh, ninth, eleventh, twelfth and Prehistoric music, music of ancient Greece, Medieval music (c. 500–1400), Renaissance music (1400-1600), Baroque music (c. 1600–1760), Classical music (c. 1730–1820), Romantic music (c. 1815–1910), Impressionist music (c. 1880–1900), 20th-century music.

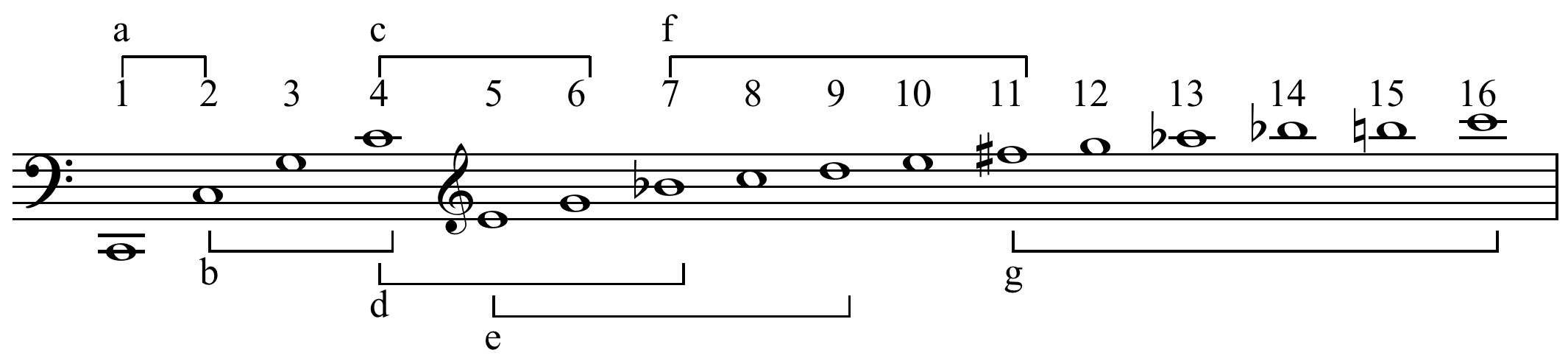
The composer Paul Cooper proposes the following timeline: A) unison and octave singing (magadizing) in Greek music and Ambrosian and Greek chant, B) parallel fourths and fifths in organum "from c. 850" C) "triadic music; from c. 1400" D) chordal seventh, from c. 1600 E) chordal ninth, from c. 1750 F) whole-tone scale, from c. 1880" G) total chromaticism, twelve-tone technique, and microtones in the early 20th-century.

A 1996 book by Thomas J. Harrison, 1910, the Emancipation of Dissonance, uses Schoenberg's "revolution" to trace other movements in the arts around that time.
