= Dyad (music) =

Pair of pitches that may imply a chord

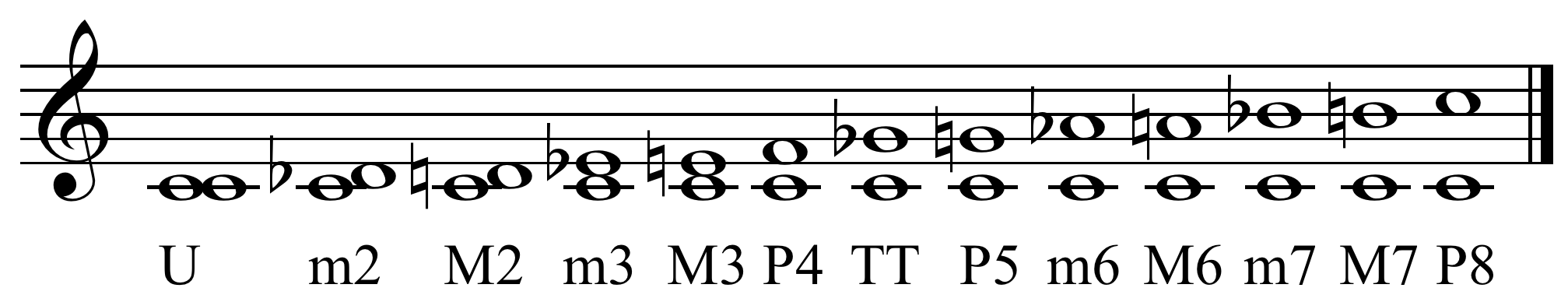
All dyads within an octave on C.

In music, a dyad (less commonly, diad) is a set of two notes or pitches. The notes of a dyad can be played simultaneously or in succession. Notes played in succession form a melodic interval; notes played simultaneously form a harmonic interval.

Dyads can be classified by the interval between the notes. For example, the interval between C and E (four half steps) is a major third, which can imply a C major chord, made up of the notes C, E and G.

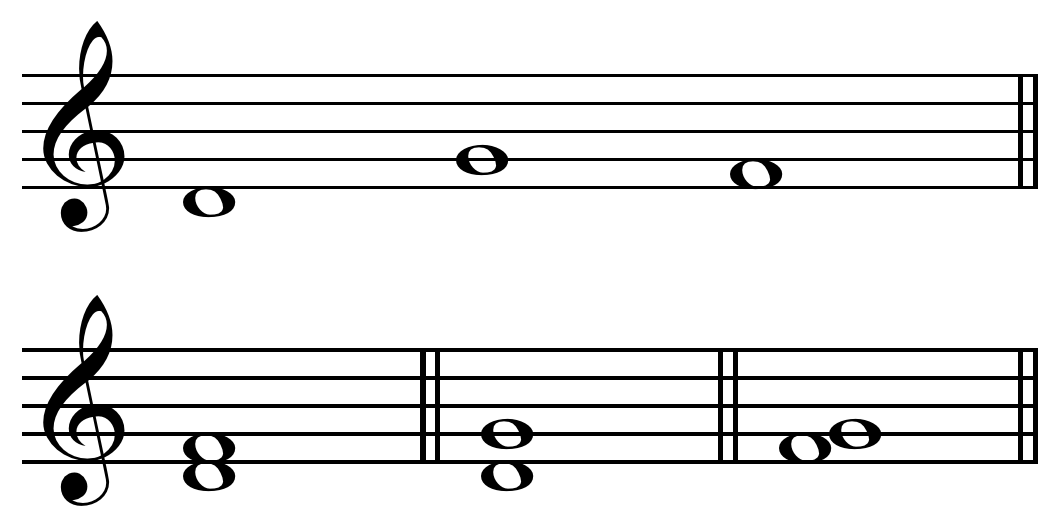
Melodic and harmonic intervals, respectively above and below.

== See also ==
- Double stop
- Interval (music)
- Power chord
- Harmonic series (music)
- Counterpoint
