= Heptachord =

Seven-note series in musical notation

Heptachord based on D, modal pattern: 1½11½1, 2 consecutive tetrachords

Heptachord lyre

A heptachord, from Greek heptachordos, from ancient Greek ἑπτάχορδος (heptákhordos, "seven-stringed"), from ἑπτά (heptá, "seven") + χορδή (khordḗ, "chord"), is a seven-stringed lyre of ancient Greece, the interval of a seventh, or a (diatonic) scale of seven notes or tones.

== 7-stringed lyre ==
Most of the ancient greek lyres had 7 strings. Early lyres originate in ancient Mesopotamia.

== Interval of a seventh ==
Two intervals are possible:

- Minor seventh, 10 semitones
- Major seventh, 11 semitones

== Scale of seven notes ==
A heptachord is based on two consecutive tetrachords.

=== Basic tetrachords ===
1½1, ½11, 11½

and the tritone
111

=== Heptachord linear ===
1½11½1

=== Heptachord circle ===
Heptachordal circle

=== 7 modes ===
The 7 modal patterns for the Babylonian heptachords are:

Babylonian tonal system
Mode	Pattern	Center note	Semitones	Tritones
kitmum	1½11½1	D	10	0
pītum	½11½11	E	10	0
qablītum	11½11½	C	10	0
išartum	1½111½	G	10	1
embūbum	½111½1	A	10	1
nīd qablim	111½11	B	11	2
nīš tuḫrim	11½111	F	11	2

=== 6 cyclic consecutive heptachords ===
Circle of fourths, kitmum, 36 notes, 60 semitones = Anu 𒀭

=== Tuning ===
A tuning procedure ‘loosening’ (TU.LU) in Music of Mesopotamia for a 7-stringed instrument based on a transposition to D/D♭:

‘tightening’ (GÍD.I)

=== Basic tetrachord with 4 semitones ===
½1½

=== Heptachords with 9 semitones ===
½1½1½1 and 1½1½1½
