= Atonality =

Music that lacks a tonal center or key

Ending of Schoenberg's "George Lieder" Op. 15/1 presents what would be an "extraordinary" chord in tonal music, without the harmonic-contrapuntal constraints of tonal music.

Atonality in its broadest sense is music that lacks a tonal center, or key. Atonality, in this sense, usually describes compositions written from about the early 20th century to the present day, where a hierarchy of harmonies focusing on a single, central triad is not used, and the notes of the chromatic scale function independently of one another. More narrowly, the term atonality describes music that does not conform to the system of tonal hierarchies that characterized European classical music between the seventeenth and nineteenth centuries. "The repertory of atonal music is characterized by the occurrence of pitches in novel combinations, as well as by the occurrence of familiar pitch combinations in unfamiliar environments".

The term is also occasionally used to describe music that is neither tonal nor serial, especially the pre-twelve-tone music of the Second Viennese School, principally Alban Berg, Arnold Schoenberg, and Anton Webern. However, "as a categorical label, 'atonal' generally means only that the piece is in the Western tradition and is not 'tonal'", although there are longer periods, e.g., medieval, renaissance, and modern modal music to which this definition does not apply. "Serialism arose partly as a means of organizing more coherently the relations used in the pre-serial 'free atonal' music. ... Thus, many useful and crucial insights about even strictly serial music depend only on such basic atonal theory".

Late 19th- and early 20th-century composers such as Alexander Scriabin, Claude Debussy, Paul Hindemith, Béla Bartók, Sergei Prokofiev, Igor Stravinsky, and Edgard Varèse, have written music that has been described, in full or in part, as atonal.

== History ==
While music without a tonal center had been previously written, for example Franz Liszt's Bagatelle sans tonalité of 1885, it is with the coming of the twentieth century that the term atonality began to be applied to pieces, particularly those written by Arnold Schoenberg and The Second Viennese School. The term "atonality" was coined in 1907 by Joseph Marx in a scholarly study of tonality, which was later expanded into his doctoral thesis.

Their music arose from what was described as the "crisis of tonality" between the late nineteenth century and early twentieth century in classical music. This situation had arisen over the course of the nineteenth century due to the increasing use of

ambiguous chords, improbable harmonic inflections, and more unusual melodic and rhythmic inflections than what was possible within the styles of tonal music. The distinction between the exceptional and the normal became more and more blurred. As a result, there was a "concomitant loosening" of the synthetic bonds through which tones and harmonies had been related to one another. The connections between harmonies were uncertain even on the lowest chord-to-chord level. On higher levels, long-range harmonic relationships and implications became so tenuous, that they hardly functioned at all. At best, the felt probabilities of the style system had become obscure. At worst, they were approaching a uniformity, which provided few guides for either composition or listening.

The first phase, known as "free atonality" or "free chromaticism", involved a conscious attempt to avoid traditional diatonic harmony. Works of this period include the opera Wozzeck (1917–1922) by Alban Berg and Pierrot lunaire (1912) by Schoenberg.

The second phase, begun after World War I, was exemplified by attempts to create a systematic means of composing without tonality, most famously the method of composing with 12 tones or the twelve-tone technique. This period included Berg's Lulu and Lyric Suite, Schoenberg's Piano Concerto, his oratorio Die Jakobsleiter and numerous smaller pieces, as well as his last two string quartets. Schoenberg was the major innovator of the system. His student, Anton Webern, however, is anecdotally claimed to have begun linking dynamics and tone color to the primary row, making rows not only of pitches but of other aspects of music as well. However, actual analysis of Webern's twelve-tone works has so far failed to demonstrate the truth of this assertion. One analyst concluded, following a minute examination of the Piano Variations, op. 27, that

while the texture of this music may superficially resemble that of some serial music ... its structure does not. None of the patterns within separate nonpitch characteristics makes audible (or even numerical) sense in itself. The point is that these characteristics are still playing their traditional role of differentiation.

Twelve-tone technique, combined with the parametrization (separate organization of four aspects of music: pitch, attack character, intensity, and duration) of Olivier Messiaen, would be taken as the inspiration for serialism.

Atonality emerged as a pejorative term to condemn music in which chords were organized seemingly with no apparent coherence. In Nazi Germany, atonal music was attacked as "Bolshevik" and labeled as degenerate (Entartete Musik) along with other music produced by enemies of the Nazi regime. Many composers had their works banned by the regime, not to be played until after its collapse at the end of World War II.

After Schoenberg's death, Igor Stravinsky used the twelve-tone technique. Iannis Xenakis generated pitch sets from mathematical formulae, and also saw the expansion of tonal possibilities as part of a synthesis between the hierarchical principle and the theory of numbers, principles which have dominated music since at least the time of Parmenides.

=== Free atonality ===
The twelve-tone technique was preceded by Schoenberg's freely atonal pieces of 1908 to 1923, which, though free, often have as an "integrative element...a minute intervallic cell" that in addition to expansion may be transformed as with a tone row, and in which individual notes may "function as pivotal elements, to permit overlapping statements of a basic cell or the linking of two or more basic cells". The decay of the sense of tonality and the subsequent distribution into individual elements brought three concepts into play: 1. Musical elements that had since been secondary to tonal form groups now became autonomous. 2. The absence of tonal coherence prompted the search for a unity that could connect the disjointed musical language in an alternative way. 3. Due to the replacement of diatonic principles, new concepts of form arose.

The twelve-tone technique was also preceded by nondodecaphonic serial composition used independently in the works of Alexander Scriabin, Igor Stravinsky, Béla Bartók, Carl Ruggles, Elisabeth Lutyens and others. "Essentially, Schoenberg and Hauer systematized and defined for their own dodecaphonic purposes a pervasive technical feature of 'modern' musical practice, the ostinato."

== Characteristics ==
Opening of Schoenberg's Klavierstück, Op. 11, No. 1, exemplifying his four procedures as listed by Kostka & Payne 1995

Kostka and Payne list four procedures as operational in the atonal music of Schoenberg, all of which may be taken as negative rules. Avoidance of melodic or harmonic octaves, avoidance of traditional pitch collections such as major or minor triads, avoidance of more than three successive pitches from the same diatonic scale, and use of disjunct melodies (avoidance of conjunct melodies).

Further, Perle agrees with Oster and Katz that, "the abandonment of the concept of a root-generator of the individual chord is a radical development that renders futile any attempt at a systematic formulation of chord structure and progression in atonal music along the lines of traditional harmonic theory". Atonal compositional techniques and results "are not reducible to a set of foundational assumptions in terms of which the compositions that are collectively designated by the expression 'atonal music' can be said to represent 'a system' of composition". Equal-interval chords are often of indeterminate root, mixed-interval chords are often best characterized by their interval content, while both lend themselves to atonal contexts.

Perle also points out that structural coherence is most often achieved through operations on intervallic cells. A cell "may operate as a kind of microcosmic set of fixed intervallic content, statable either as a chord or as a melodic figure or as a combination of both. Its components may be fixed with regard to order, in which event it may be employed, like the twelve-tone set, in its literal transformations. … Individual tones may function as pivotal elements, to permit overlapping statements of a basic cell or the linking of two or more basic cells".

Regarding the post-tonal music of Perle, one theorist wrote: "While ... montages of discrete-seeming elements tend to accumulate global rhythms other than those of tonal progressions and their rhythms, there is a similarity between the two sorts of accumulates spatial and temporal relationships: a similarity consisting of generalized arching tone-centers linked together by shared background referential materials".

== Reception and legacy ==
=== Controversy over the term itself ===
The term "atonality" itself has been controversial. Arnold Schoenberg, whose music is generally used to define the term, was vehemently opposed to it, arguing that "The word 'atonal' could only signify something entirely inconsistent with the nature of tone... to call any relation of tones atonal is just as farfetched as it would be to designate a relation of colors aspectral or acomplementary. There is no such antithesis".

Composer and theorist Milton Babbitt also disparaged the term, saying "The works that followed, many of them now familiar, include the Five Pieces for Orchestra, Erwartung, Pierrot Lunaire, and they and a few yet to follow soon were termed 'atonal,' by I know not whom, and I prefer not to know, for in no sense does the term make sense. Not only does the music employ 'tones,' but it employs precisely the same 'tones,' the same physical materials, that music had employed for some two centuries. In all generosity, 'atonal' may have been intended as a mildly analytically derived term to suggest 'atonic' or to signify 'a-triadic tonality', but, even so there were infinitely many things the music was not".

"Atonal" developed a certain vagueness in meaning as a result of its use to describe a wide variety of compositional approaches that deviated from traditional chords and chord progressions. Attempts to solve these problems by using terms such as "pan-tonal", "non-tonal", "multi-tonal", "free-tonal" and "without tonal center" instead of "atonal" have not gained broad acceptance.

=== Criticism of the concept of atonality ===
Composer Anton Webern held that "new laws asserted themselves that made it impossible to designate a piece as being in one key or another". Composer Walter Piston, on the other hand, said that, out of long habit, whenever performers "play any little phrase they will hear it in some key—it may not be the right one, but the point is they will play it with a tonal sense. ... [T]he more I feel I know Schoenberg's music the more I believe he thought that way himself. ... And it isn't only the players; it's also the listeners. They will hear tonality in everything".

Donald Jay Grout similarly doubted whether atonality is really possible, because "any combination of sounds can be referred to as a fundamental root". He defined it as a fundamentally subjective category: "atonal music is music in which the person who is using the word cannot hear tonal centers".

One difficulty is that even an otherwise "atonal" work, tonality "by assertion" is normally heard on the thematic or linear level. That is, centricity may be established through the repetition of a central pitch or from emphasis by means of instrumentation, register, rhythmic elongation, or metric accent.

=== Criticism of atonal music ===
Swiss conductor, composer, and musical philosopher Ernest Ansermet, a critic of atonal music, wrote extensively on this in the book Les fondements de la musique dans la conscience humaine (The Foundations of Music in Human Consciousness), where he argued that the classical musical language was a precondition for musical expression with its clear, harmonious structures. Ansermet argued that a tone system can only lead to a uniform perception of music if it is deduced from just a single interval. For Ansermet this interval is the fifth.

In France, on December 20, 2012, French pianist Jérôme Ducros gave a lecture at the Collège de France entitled Atonalism. And after? as part of Karol Beffa's chair of artistic creation. He compares the discursive properties of tonal language and non-tonal languages, largely giving the advantage to the former, and considers the return of tonality as inevitable. This lecture sparked a heated controversy in the French musical world.

== See also ==
- Emancipation of the dissonance
- Jazz improvisation
- Klangfarbenmelodie
- Neue Musik
- Noise music
- List of atonal compositions
