= Retrograde (music) =

Playing back a passage of notes

A melodic line that is the reverse of a previously or simultaneously stated line is said to be its retrograde or cancrizans (/ˈkæŋkrɪˌzænz/ "walking backward", medieval Latin, from cancer "crab"). An exact retrograde includes both the pitches and rhythms in reverse. An even more exact retrograde reverses the physical contour of the notes themselves, though this is possible only in electronic music. Some composers choose to subject just the pitches of a musical line to retrograde, or just the rhythms. In twelve-tone music, reversal of the pitch classes alone—regardless of the melodic contour created by their registral placement—is regarded as a retrograde.

== In modal and tonal music ==
=== In treatises ===
Retrograde was not mentioned in theoretical treatises prior to 1500. Nicola Vicentino (1555) discussed the difficulty in finding canonic imitation: "At times, the fugue or canon cannot be discovered through the systems mentioned above, either because of the impediment of rests, or because one part is going up while another is going down, or because one part starts at the beginning and the other at the end. In such cases a student can begin at the end and work back to the beginning in order to find where and in which voice he should begin the canons." Vicentino derided those who achieved purely intellectual pleasure from retrograde (and similar permutations): "A composer of such fancies must try to make canons and fugues that are pleasant and full of sweetness and harmony. He should not make a canon in the shape of a tower, a mountain, a river, a chessboard, or other objects, for these compositions create a loud noise in many voices, with little harmonic sweetness. To tell the truth, a listening is more likely to be induced to vexation than to delight by these disproportioned fancies, which are devoid of pleasant harmony and contrary to the goal of the imitation of the nature of the words."

Thomas Morley (1597) described retrograde in the context of canons and mentions a work by Byrd. Friedrich Wilhelm Marpurg (1754) notes various names for the procedure imitatio retrograda or cancrizans or per motum retrogradum and says it is used primarily in canons and fugues.

Some writers acknowledge that hearing retrograde in music is a challenge, and consider it a self-referential compositional device.

=== In music ===
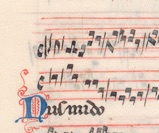
Nusmido, folio 150 verso of manuscript Pluteo 29.1, located in the Laurentian Library in Florence - the earliest known example of retrograde in music

Despite not being mentioned in theoretical treatises prior to 1500, compositions written before that date show retrograde. According to Willi Apel, the earliest example of retrograde in music is the 13th century clausula, Nusmido, in which the tenor has the liturgical melody "Dominus" in retrograde (found in the manuscript Pluteo 29.1, folio 150 verso, located in the Laurentian Library in Florence). (The word "Nusmido" is a syllabic retrograde of the word "Dominus.")

Surveying medieval examples of retrograde, Virginia Newes notes that early composers were often also poets, and that musical retrogrades could have been based on similarly constructed poetic texts. She quotes Daniel Poirion in suggesting that the retrograde canon in Machaut's three-voice rondeau, "Ma Fin est mon Commencement" could symbolize a metaphysical view of death as rebirth, or else the ideal circle of the courtly outlook, which encloses all initiatives and all ends. She concludes that, whatever the reasons, construction of retrogrades and their transmission were part of the medieval composers' world, as they prized symmetry and balance as intellectual feats in addition to the aural experience.

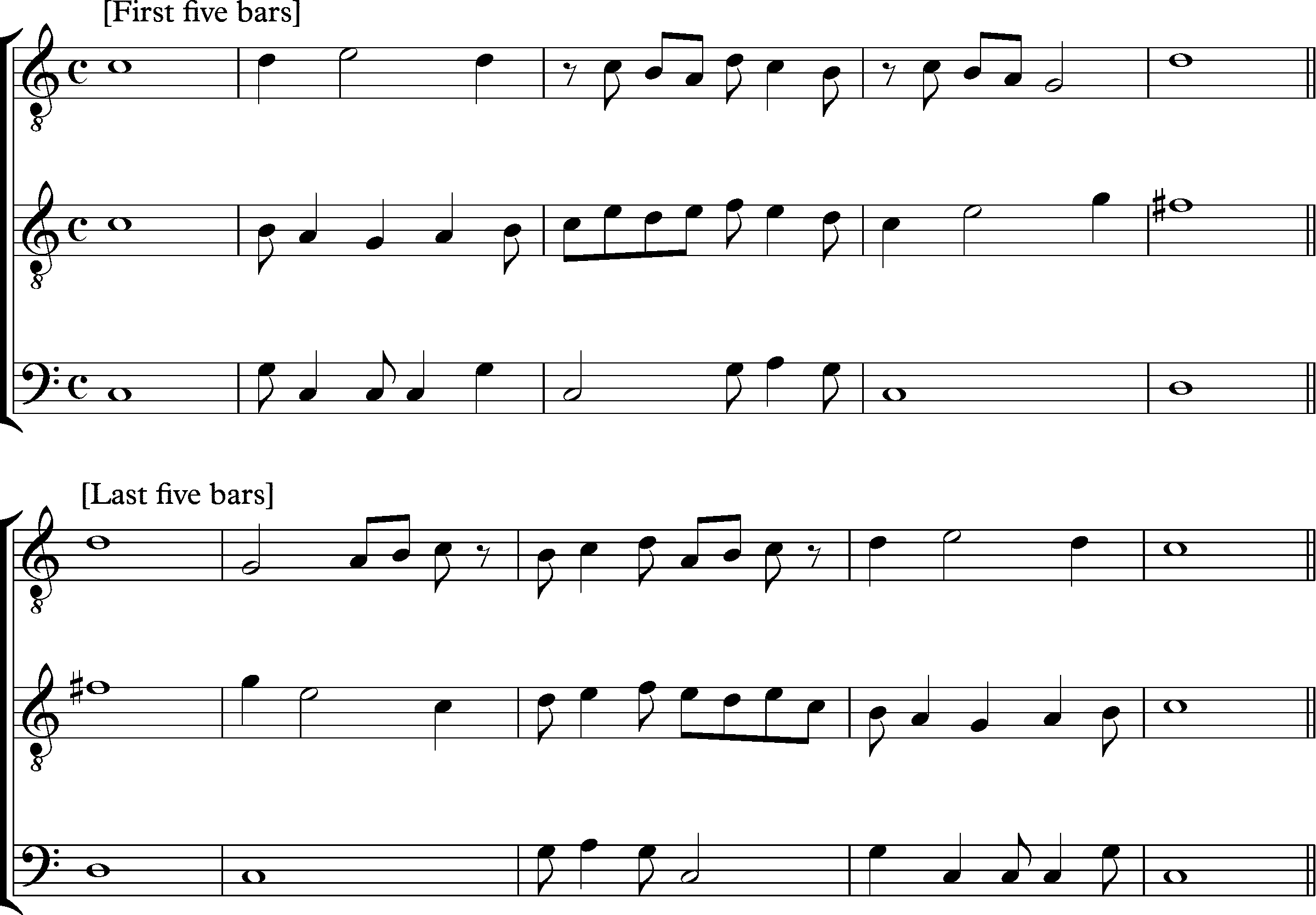
Machaut, the opening and closing bars of 'ma fin est mon commencement' (My end is my beginning.) Listen

Todd notes that although some composers (John Dunstaple, Guillaume Dufay and Johannes Ockeghem) used retrograde occasionally, they did not combine it with other permutations. In contradistinction, Antoine Busnois and Jacob Obrecht, used retrograde and other permutations extensively, suggesting familiarity with one another's compositional techniques. Todd also notes that, by use of retrograde, inversion, and retrograde-inversion, composers of this time viewed music in a way similar to serialists of the 20th century.

However, as Edmund Rubbra (1960, p. 35) points out, “This is, of course, a purely mental concept, as music can never do anything but go forwards, even if the given tune is reversed. The different relationships set up by reversing the direction of a theme make it completely unrecognizable; and when a composer indulges in this device the disclosure of it makes not the slightest difference to our apprehension of the music, which must be listened to as going parallel with the time-processes of our existence.”

Nevertheless, there are examples of retrograde motion in the music of J.S. Bach, Haydn and Beethoven. Bach’s Musical Offering includes a two-voice canon in which the second voice performs the melodic line of first voice backwards:

Bach Canon 2 from Musical offering

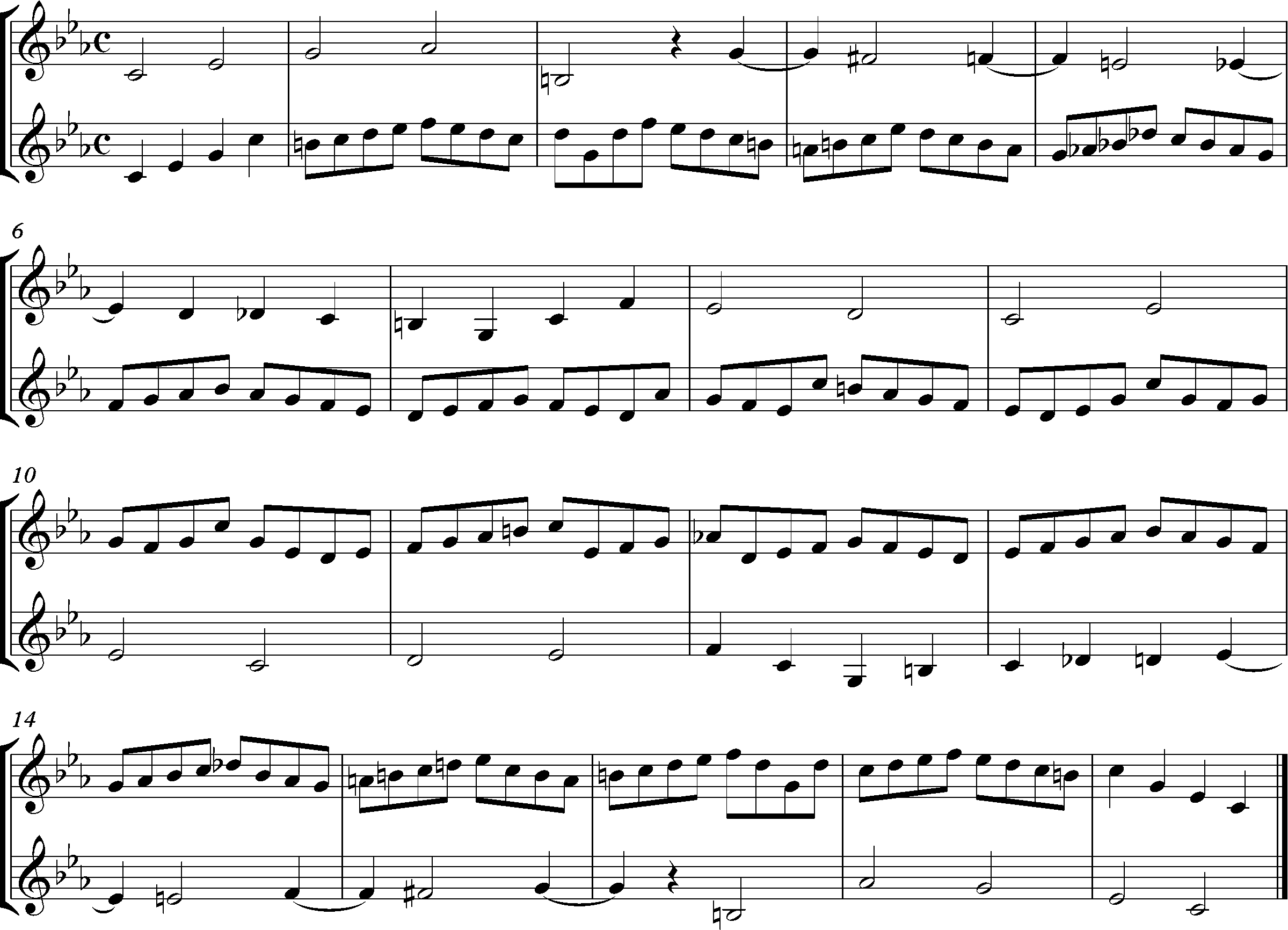
Bach, two part canon from 'The Musical Offering.' The lower part is an exact retrograde of the upper part.

The minuet (third) movement of Joseph Haydn’s, Symphony no. 47, is an exact palindrome. Haydn also transcribed this piece for piano and this version forms the second movement of his Piano Sonata in A major XVI/26

Minuet from Piano Sonata in A

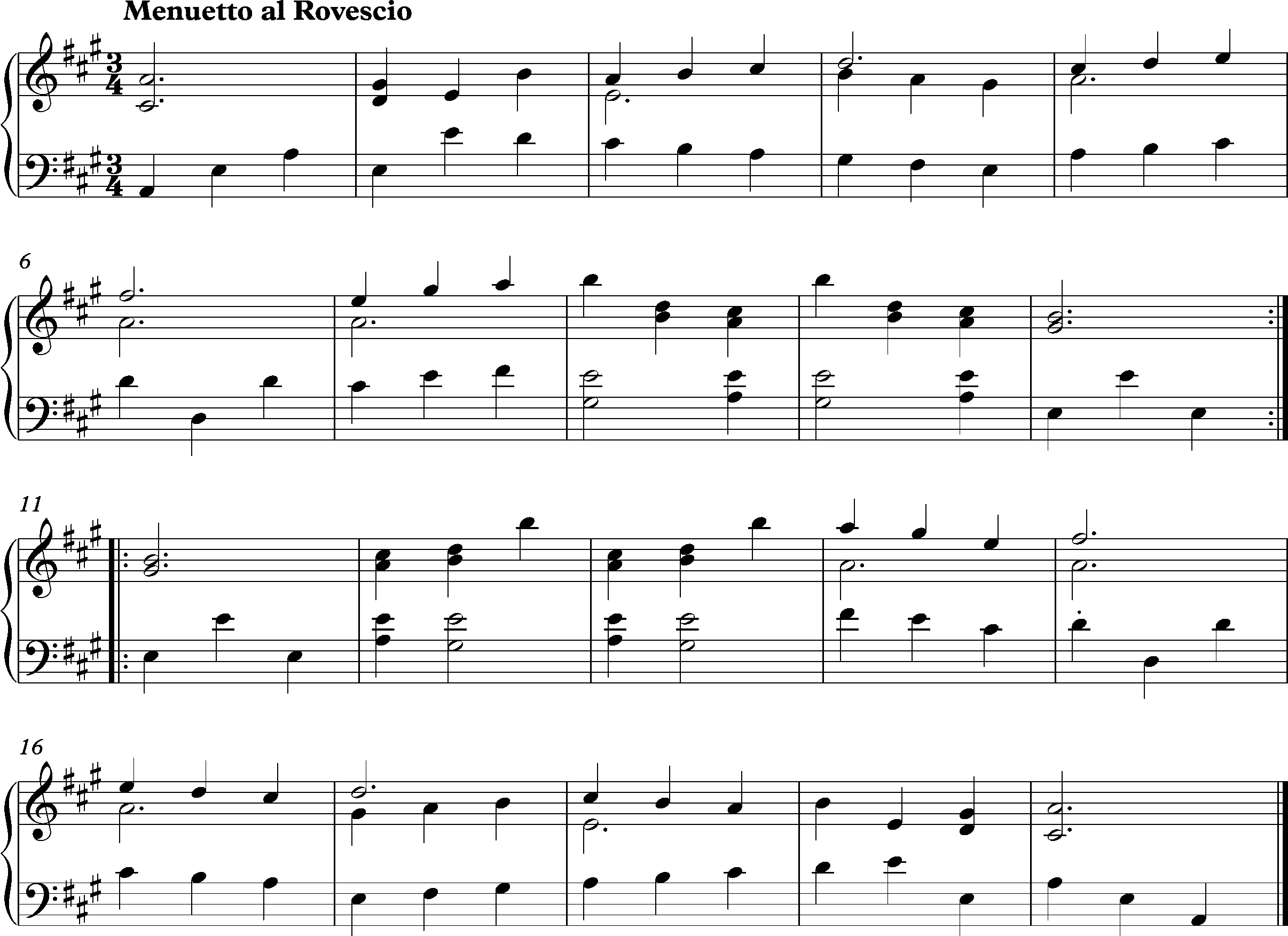
Minuet 'al rovescio' from Haydn Sonata in A major.

The fugal fourth movement of Beethoven, Piano Sonata no. 29, op. 106, "Hammerklavier", has the following main theme:

Hammerklavier fugue subject, first four bars

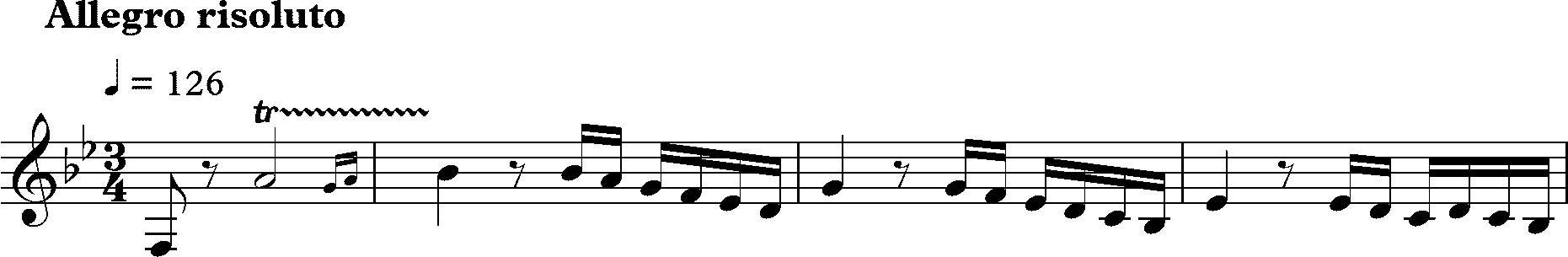
Hammerklavier fugue subject, first four bars

Later in this movement, Beethoven conjures up and uses the retrograde version of the subject. Beethoven does not create a strict note-for-note reversal of the theme.

Hammerklavier fugue subject, retrograde version, last four bars

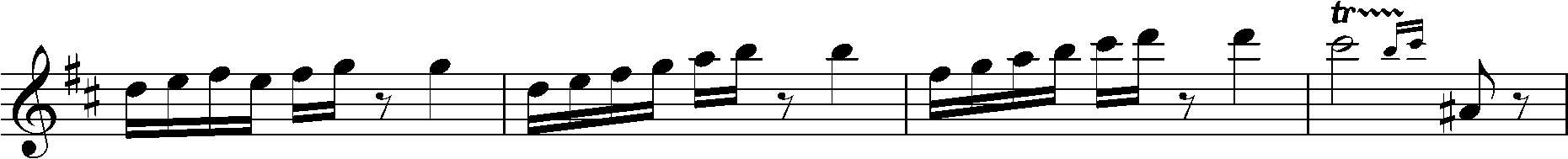
Hammerklavier fugue subject, retrograde version, last four bars

=== Examples in modal and tonal music ===
- Guillaume de Machaut, Ma fin est mon commencement (rondeau 14)
- William Byrd, "Diliges Dominum", no. 25 from Cantiones Sacrae
- Jacob Obrecht, Missa Grecorum, Agnus Dei
- Leonhard Päminger, Vexilla regis prodeunt, from the Secundus tomus ecclesiasticarum cantionum (Nuremberg, 1573).
- Gregorius Joseph Werner, Der curiose musikalische Instrumentalkalende, Die Sonne im Krebs (Menuetto cancrizante)
- Joseph Haydn, canon, "Thy Voice, O Harmony"
- Joseph Haydn, Symphony No. 47, 3rd movement, "Minuetto al Roverso"
- Joseph Haydn, piano sonata, XVI/26, minuet (a transcription of the 3rd movement from Symphony No. 47)
- Joseph Haydn, Violin Sonata no. 4
- Carl Philipp Emanuel Bach, Minuet, C major
- Wolfgang Amadeus Mozart, Trio al rovescio from the minuet of the Serenade in C minor (a work which was later arranged for string quintet).
- Adalbert Gyrowetz, Trio al rovescio from the minuet of the String Quartet in G major, Op. 29/2.
- Beethoven, Piano Sonata no.29, Op.106, "Hammerklavier", fugal fourth movement includes an episode with the subject in retrograde
- Franz Schubert, Die Zauberharfe, No. 3, Melodram ("Der Finke fing")
- Franz Schubert, Sonata in A major, D. 959. In what is a framing device which is probably unprecedented in the sonata literature, the finale of the sonata ends in a near-exact cancrizans (retrograde) of the chorale fanfare that begins the first movement (one example in many of the brilliant examples of cyclicism seen throughout the sonata as a whole).
- John Stainer, "Per Recte et Retro"
- John Tavener "The Lamb"

== In post-tonal music ==
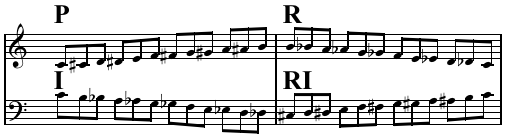
Prime (top-left), retrograde (top-right), inverse (bottom-left), and retrograde-inverse (bottom-right).

As early as 1923, Arnold Schoenberg expressed the equivalence of melodic and harmonic presentation as a "unity of musical space." Taking the example of a hat, Schoenberg explained that the hat remains the same no matter if it is observed from below or above, from one side or another. Similarly, permutations such as inversion, retrograde, and retrograde inversion are a way to create musical space.

Heinrich Jalowetz discussed Arnold Schoenberg's frequent use of retrograde (and other permutations) as a compositional device for twelve-tone music: "The technique serves two main functions. One is to provide a substitute for classical tonality, with all its melodic and harmonic consequences...The second function is to provide a means of interrelationship. This is done by presenting the row not only in normal position but in inversion, retrogression, and retrograde inversion. The music derives a strict inner cohesion through the artful treatment of such relationships, even though the listener may often be unable to follow what is happening."

In twelve-tone music, retrograde treatment of pitch is a commonplace, but rhythmic retrogrades are comparatively rare. Examples of rhythmic retrogrades occur in the music of Alban Berg, for example in the operas Wozzeck and Lulu, and in the Chamber Concerto. In discussing Berg's extensive use of retrograde and palindrome, Robert Morgan coins the word "circular" to describe musical situations "in which an opening gesture returns at a composition's close, thereby joining the music's temporal extremes."

Dorothy Slepian, writing in 1947, observed that "modern American composers write canons that, whether simple or complicated in structure, clearly discernible or subtly concealed, are a natural means of expression growing directly out of the individual needs of the melodic material. Therefore, most of the composers regard cancrizans as an artificial device imposed upon a theme rather than as a consequence germinated by it." Specifically, Douglas Moore, Harold Morris, Paul Creston, and Bernard Rogers "flatly refute the expressive powers of the cancrizans" whereas Walter Piston, Adolph Weiss, Wallingford Riegger, and Roger Sessions use it often. One particularly colorful and effective example is found in the second movement of Piston's Concerto for Orchestra, where continuous rapid string passages with an ostinato bass rhythm and a melody in the English horn returns later in the movement performed backwards as a recapitulation.

=== Examples in post-tonal music ===
- Alban Berg, Der Wein (1929), "Der Wein der Liebenden" (measures 112–40 are then heard in retrograde as measures 140–70)
- Alban Berg, Lulu, the "silent film " interlude in Act 2.
- Ruth Crawford Seeger, Diaphonic Suite No. 3 for two clarinets (1930), third movement, the first clarinet in bars 45–56 present an exact retrograde of the same part, bars 2–13,
- Karel Goeyvaerts, Nummer 5 met zuivere tonen (Number 5 with Pure Tones, 1953) superimposes an exact retrograde of its materials on the "forwards" version. As a result, not only does each event in the second half occur according to an axis of symmetry at the centre of the work, but each event itself is reversed, so that the note attacks in the first half become note decays in the second, and vice versa.
- Paul Hindemith's Ludus Tonalis cycle is highly palindromic, its Postludium being almost a retrograde inversion of its Introitus.
- Charles Ives, Scherzo: All the Way Around and Back (1907–08) is palindromic.
- Olivier Messiaen, "Abîme des oiseaux", from the Quatuor pour la fin du temps (1941) exhibits many retrograde relationships among its elements, as well as one rhythm that is "a retrograde version of rāgavardhana, No. 93 in Sharngadeva's collection," the Sangita Ratnakara.
- Luigi Nono, Incontri (1955).
- Carl Ruggles, Sun-Treader (1926–31) has a rhythmically free pitch palindrome in b. 68–118, and a retrograde canon in b. 124–33.
- Igor Stravinsky, Canticum Sacrum (1956). The fifth movement is an almost exact retrograde of the first.
- Iannis Xenakis, Metastaseis (1953–54) contains many instances of retrograde relationships.

== Non-retrogradable rhythm ==
In music and music theory, a non-retrogradable rhythm is a rhythmic palindrome, i.e., a pattern of note durations that is read or performed the same either forwards or backwards. The term is used most frequently in the context of the music of Olivier Messiaen. For example, such rhythms occur in the "Liturgie de cristal" and "Danse de la fureur, pour les sept trompettes"—the first and sixth movements—of Messiaen's Quatuor pour la fin du temps.

== See also ==
- Crab canon
- Palindrome
- Permutation (music)
- Retrograde inversion
