= Transposition (music) =

Operation in music

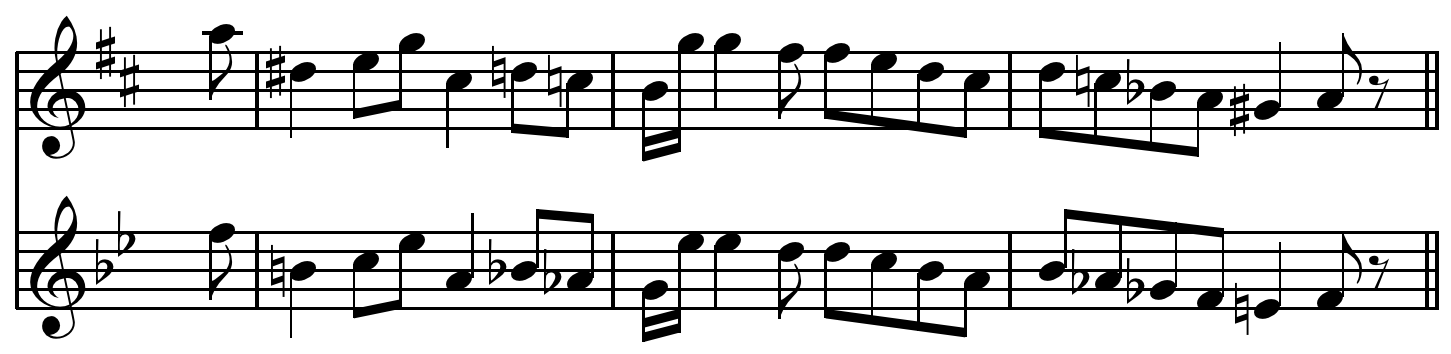
Transposition example from Koch. In this chromatic transposition, the melody on the first line is in the key of D, while the melody on the second line is identical except that it is a major third lower, in the key of B♭.

In music, transposition refers to the process or operation of moving a collection of notes (pitches or pitch classes) up or down in pitch by a constant interval.

The shifting of a melody, a harmonic progression or an entire musical piece to another key, while maintaining the same tone structure, i.e. the same succession of whole tones and semitones and remaining melodic intervals.

— Musikalisches Lexicon, 879 (1865), Heinrich Christoph Koch (trans. Schuijer)

For example, a music transposer might transpose an entire piece of music into another key. Similarly, one might transpose a tone row or an unordered collection of pitches such as a chord so that it begins on another pitch.

The transposition of a set A by n semitones is designated by T_{n}(A), representing the addition (modulo 12) of an integer n to each of the pitch class integers of the set A. Thus the set (A) consisting of 0–1–2 transposed by 5 semitones is 5–6–7 (T_{5}(A)) since 0 + 5 = 5, 1 + 5 = 6, and 2 + 5 = 7.

== Scalar transpositions ==
In scalar transposition, every pitch in a collection is shifted up or down a fixed number of scale steps within some scale. The pitches remain in the same scale before and after the shift. This term covers both chromatic and diatonic transpositions as follows.

=== Chromatic transposition ===
Chromatic transposition is scalar transposition within the chromatic scale, implying that every pitch in a collection of notes is shifted by the same number of semitones. For instance, transposing the pitches C_{4}–E_{4}–G_{4} upward by four semitones, one obtains the pitches E_{4}–G♯_{4}–B_{4}.

=== Diatonic transposition ===
Diatonic transposition is scalar transposition within a diatonic scale (the most common kind of scale, indicated by one of a few standard key signatures). For example, transposing the pitches C_{4}–E_{4}–G_{4} up two steps in the familiar C major scale gives the pitches E_{4}–G_{4}–B_{4}. Transposing the same pitches up by two steps in the F major scale instead gives E_{4}–G_{4}–B♭_{4}.

== Pitch and pitch class transpositions ==
There are two further kinds of transposition, by pitch interval or by pitch interval class, applied to pitches or pitch classes, respectively. Transposition may be applied to pitches or to pitch classes. For example, the pitch A_{4}, or 9, transposed by a major third, or the pitch interval 4:
$$9 + 4 = 13;$$
while that pitch class, 9, transposed by a major third, or the pitch class interval 4:
$$9 + 4 =13 \equiv 1\pmod{12}.$$

== Sight transposition ==
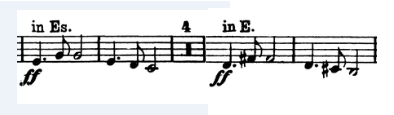
Excerpt of the trumpet part of Symphony No. 9 of Antonín Dvořák, where sight transposition is required.

Although transpositions are usually written out, musicians are occasionally asked to transpose music "at sight", that is, to read the music in one key while playing in another. Musicians who play transposing instruments sometimes have to do this (for example when encountering an unusual transposition, such as clarinet in C), as well as singers' accompanists, since singers sometimes request a different key than the one printed in the music to better fit their vocal range (although many, but not all, songs are printed in editions for high, medium, and low voice).

There are three basic techniques for teaching sight transposition: interval, clef, and numbers.

=== Interval ===
First one determines the interval between the written key and the target key. Then one imagines the notes up (or down) by the corresponding interval. A performer using this method may calculate each note individually, or group notes together (e.g. "a descending chromatic passage starting on F" might become a "descending chromatic passage starting on A" in the target key).

=== Clef ===
Clef transposition is routinely taught (among other places) in Belgium and France. One imagines a different clef and a different key signature than the ones printed. The change of clef is used so that the lines and spaces correspond to different notes than the lines and spaces of the original score. Seven clefs are used for this: treble (2nd line G-clef), bass (4th line F-clef), baritone (3rd line F-clef or 5th line C-clef, although in France and Belgium sight-reading exercises for this clef, as a preparation for clef transposition practice, are always printed with the 3rd line F-clef), and C-clefs on the four lowest lines; these allow any given staff position to correspond to each of the seven note names A through G. The signature is then adjusted for the actual accidental (natural, sharp or flat) one wants on that note. The octave may also have to be adjusted (this sort of practice ignores the conventional octave implication of the clefs), but this is a trivial matter for most musicians.

=== Numbers ===
Transposing by numbers means, one determines the scale degree of the written note (e.g. first, fourth, fifth, etc.) in the given key. The performer then plays the corresponding scale degree of the target chord.

== Transpositional equivalence ==
Two musical objects are transpositionally equivalent if one can be transformed into another by transposition. It is similar to enharmonic equivalence, octave equivalence, and inversional equivalence. In many musical contexts, transpositionally equivalent chords are thought to be similar. Transpositional equivalence is a feature of musical set theory. The terms transposition and transposition equivalence allow the concept to be discussed as both an operation and relation, an activity and a state of being. Compare with modulation and related key.

Using integer notation and modulo 12, to transpose a pitch x by n semitones:
$$\boldsymbol{T}^p_n (x) = x+n,$$
or
$$\boldsymbol{T}^p_n (x) \rightarrow x+n.$$

For pitch class transposition by a pitch class interval:
$$\boldsymbol{T}_n (x) = x+n \pmod{12}.$$

== Twelve-tone transposition ==
Milton Babbitt defined the "transformation" of transposition within the twelve-tone technique as follows: By applying the transposition operator (T) to a [twelve-tone] set we will mean that every p of the set P is mapped homomorphically (with regard to order) into a T(p) of the set T(P) according to the following operation:
$$\boldsymbol{T}_o(p_{i,j})=p_{i,j}+t_o,$$
where t_{o} is any integer 0–11 inclusive, where, of course, the t_{o} remains fixed for a given transposition. The '+' sign indicates ordinary transposition. Here T_{o} is the transposition corresponding to t_{o} (or o, according to Schuijer); p_{i,j} is the pitch of the ith tone in P belong to the pitch class (set number) j. (Note: p = element, P = twelve-tone series, i = order number, j = pitch-class number.)

Allen Forte defines transposition so as to apply to unordered sets of other than twelve pitches:

the addition mod 12 of any integer k in S to every integer p of P,

thus giving, "12 transposed forms of P". (Note: p = element, P = pitch class set, S = universal set.)

== Fuzzy transposition ==
Joseph Straus created the concept of fuzzy transposition, and fuzzy inversion, to express transposition as a voice-leading event, "the 'sending' of each element of a given PC [pitch-class] set to its T_{n}–correspondent ... [enabling] him to relate PC sets of two adjacent chords in terms of a transposition, even when not all of the 'voices' participated fully in the transpositional move." A transformation within voice-leading space rather than pitch-class space as in pitch class transposition.

== See also ==
- List of music software
- Modulation (music)
- Pitch shift
- Transposing instrument
- Capo
