= Pitch class =

Set of all pitches that are a whole number of octaves apart

Perfect octave
All Cs from C_{1} to C_{7} inclusive

In music, a pitch class (p.c. or pc) is a set of all pitches that are a whole number of octaves apart; for example, the pitch class C consists of the Cs in all octaves. "The pitch class C stands for all possible Cs, in whatever octave position." Important to musical set theory, a pitch class is "all pitches related to each other by octave, enharmonic equivalence, or both". Thus, using scientific pitch notation, the pitch class C is the set

$$\{ \mathrm{C}_n : n \text{ is an integer} \} = { \rm \{\cdots, C_{-2}, C_{-1}, C_0, C_1, C_2, \cdots \} }$$

Although there is no formal upper or lower limit to this sequence, only a few of these pitches are audible to humans. Pitch class is important because human pitch-perception is periodic: pitches belonging to the same pitch class are perceived as having a similar quality or color, a property called "octave equivalence".

Psychologists refer to the quality of a pitch as its chroma. A chroma is an attribute of pitches (as opposed to tone height), just as hue is an attribute of color. A pitch class is a set of all pitches that share the same chroma, just like "the set of all white things" is the collection of all white objects.

== Integer notation ==
Integer notation.

Integer notation is the translation of pitch classes or interval classes into whole numbers. Thus if C = 0, then C♯ = 1 ... A♯ = 10, B = 11, with "10" and "11" substituted by "t" and "e" in some sources, A and B in others (like the duodecimal numeral system, which also uses "t" and "e", or A and B, for "10" and "11"). This allows the most economical presentation of information regarding post-tonal materials.

In the integer model of pitch, all pitch classes and intervals between pitch classes are designated using the numbers 0 through 11. It is not used to notate music for performance, but is a common analytical and compositional tool when working with chromatic music, including twelve tone, serial, or otherwise atonal music.

Pitch classes can be notated in this way by assigning the number 0 to some note and assigning consecutive integers to consecutive semitones; so if 0 is C♮, 1 is C♯, 2 is D♮ and so on up to 11, which is B♮. The C above this is not 12, but 0 again (12 − 12 = 0). Thus arithmetic modulo 12 is used to represent octave equivalence. Below is an example numbering starting at B♮:

$$\begin{array}{c}
\rm B & \rm C & \rm C\sharp & \rm D & \rm E\flat & \rm E & \rm F & \rm F\sharp & \rm G & \rm G\sharp & \rm A & \rm B\flat \\
0 & 1 & 2 & 3 & 4 & 5 & 6 & 7 & 8 & 9 & 10 & 11
\end{array}$$

One advantage of this system is that it equally treats all notes which are enharmonically equivalent to each other (B♯, C♮ and D are all 0) according to their diatonic functionality.

=== Disadvantages ===
There are a few disadvantages with integer notation. First, theorists have traditionally used the same integers to indicate elements of different tuning systems. Thus, the numbers 0, 1, 2, ... 5, are used to notate pitch classes in 6-tone equal temperament. This means that the meaning of a given integer changes with the underlying tuning system: "1" can refer to C♯ in 12-tone equal temperament, but D in 6-tone equal temperament.

Also, the same numbers are used to represent both pitches and intervals. For example, the number 4 serves both as a label for the pitch class E (if C = 0) and as a label for the distance between the pitch classes D and F♯. (In much the same way, the term "10 degrees" can label both a temperature and the distance between two temperatures.) Only one of these labelings is sensitive to the (arbitrary) choice of pitch class 0. For example, if one makes a different choice about which pitch class is labeled 0, then the pitch class E will no longer be labeled "4". However, the distance between D and F♯ will still be assigned the number 4. Both this and the issue in the paragraph directly above may be viewed as disadvantages (though mathematically, an element "4" should not be confused with the function "+4").

== Other ways to label pitch classes ==
Pitch class
Pitch class	Tonal counterparts	Solfege
0	C	do
1	C♯, D♭	
2	D	re
3	D♯, E♭	
4	E	mi
5	F	fa
6	F♯, G♭	
7	G	sol
8	G♯, A♭	
9	A	la
10, t or A	A♯, B♭	
11, e or B	B	ti

The system described above is flexible enough to describe any pitch class in any tuning system: for example, one can use the numbers {0, 2.4, 4.8, 7.2, 9.6} to refer to the five-tone scale that divides the octave evenly. However, in some contexts, it is convenient to use alternative labeling systems. For example, in just intonation, we may express pitches in terms of positive rational numbers p/q, expressed by reference to a 1 (often written "1/1"), which represents a fixed pitch. If a and b are two positive rational numbers, they belong to the same pitch class if and only if

$$\frac{a}{b} = 2^n$$

for some integer n. Therefore, we can represent pitch classes in this system using ratios p/q where neither p nor q is divisible by 2, that is, as ratios of odd integers. Alternatively, we can represent just intonation pitch classes by reducing to the octave, 1 ≤ p/q < 2.

It is also very common to label pitch classes with reference to some scale. For example, one can label the pitch classes of n-tone equal temperament using the integers 0 to n − 1. In much the same way, one could label the pitch classes of the C major scale, C–D–E–F–G–A–B, using the numbers from 0 to 6. This system has two advantages over the continuous labeling system described above. First, it eliminates any suggestion that there is something natural about a twelvefold division of the octave. Second, it avoids pitch-class universes with unwieldy decimal expansions when considered relative to 12; for example, in the continuous system, the pitch-classes of 19 equal temperament are labeled 0.63158..., 1.26316..., etc. Labeling these pitch classes {0, 1, 2, 3 ..., 18} simplifies the arithmetic used in pitch-class set manipulations.

The disadvantage of the scale-based system is that it assigns an infinite number of different names to chords that sound identical. For example, in twelve-tone equal-temperament the C major triad is notated {0, 4, 7}. In twenty-four-tone equal-temperament, this same triad is labeled {0, 8, 14}. Moreover, the scale-based system appears to suggest that different tuning systems use steps of the same size ("1") but have octaves of differing size ("12" in 12-tone equal-temperament, "19" in 19-tone equal temperament, and so on), whereas in fact the opposite is true: different tuning systems divide the same octave into different-sized steps.

In general, it is often more useful to use the traditional integer system when one is working within a single temperament; when one is comparing chords in different temperaments, the continuous system can be more useful.

== See also ==
- Flat (music)
- Sharp (music)
- Pitch circularity
- Pitch interval
- Tone row (List)
