= Elaine Barkin =

American composer, writer, and educator (1932–2023)

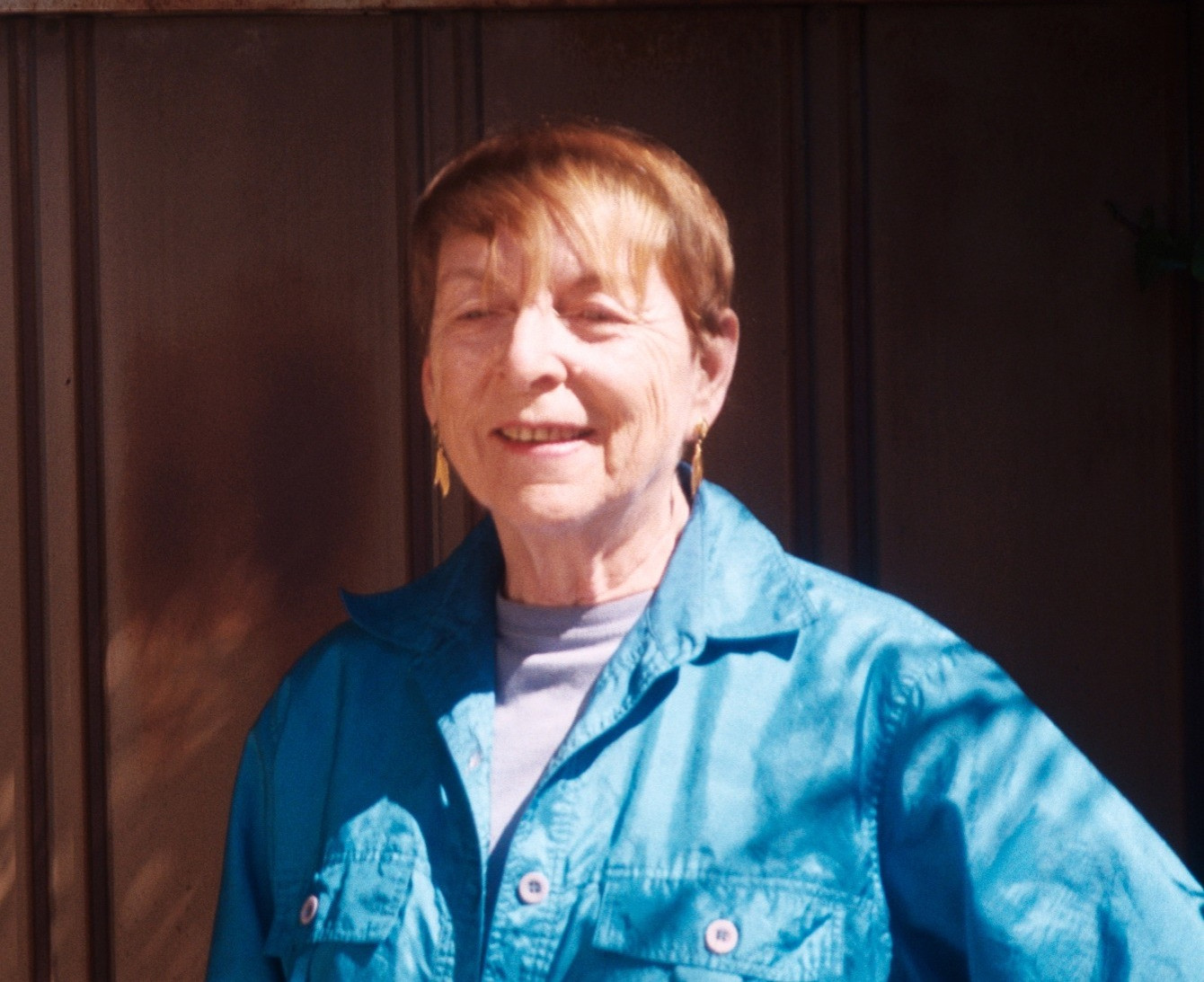
- Barkin in 2005
- Born: Elaine Radoff; December 15, 1932; The Bronx, New York U.S.
- Died: February 22, 2023 (aged 90)
- Education: Bronx High School of Science; Third Street Music School Settlement; Queens College
- Occupations: Composer, writer, and educator
- Employer(s): Queens College; University of Michigan; Princeton University; University of California, Los Angeles; Sarah Lawrence College; National Chiao Tung University; Victoria University of Wellington; Institute for Shipboard Education's Semester at Sea
- Spouse: George J. Barkin
- Relatives: Victor, Jesse, and Gabriel (sons)

Elaine "Ray" Barkin (née Radoff, December 15, 1932 – February 22, 2023) was an American composer, writer, and educator.

== Early life ==
Elaine Radoff was born in The Bronx, New York City, lived in the Amalgamated Houses, and attended Bronx High School of Science, Third Street Music School Settlement, and Queens College (BA in 1954), where she studied composition and theory with Karol Rathaus, Sol Berkowitz, Leo Kraft, and Saul Novack. At Brandeis University (MFA in 1956, PhD in 1971), her mentors in composition and theory were Irving Fine, Harold Shapero, Arthur Berger, and Seymour Shifrin. In the summer of 1955 she worked with Boris Blacher at Tanglewood and then in 1956 and 1957 at the Berlin Hochschule für Musik on a Fulbright fellowship.

In 1963, Barkin was asked by Benjamin Boretz, founding editor of the composers' journal Perspectives of New Music, to join as editor, a post she held until 1985. In 1972 she served as co-editor and when John Rahn became editor in 1984, she remained on for a year as advisory editor.

== Career ==
Barkin taught music appreciation, music theory, and composition at Queens College (1964–69), the University of Michigan (1970–74), Princeton University (Spring 1974, Council of the Humanities Fellowship), and the University of California, Los Angeles (UCLA, 1974–97). She also taught at Sarah Lawrence College (1969); National Chiao Tung University, Taiwan (May 1989); Victoria University of Wellington, New Zealand (Spring 1994); and the Institute for Shipboard Education's Semester at Sea (Fall 1996). Barkin's compositional output includes works for solo instruments, chamber ensembles, and orchestra; 4-track tape collages; solo voice and chorus; Balinese and Javanese gamelan; dancers and multi-media theater, including a chamber opera; graphic scores and scenarios for improvisation; symphonic wind ensemble; electronic-MIDI media.

In the 1980s, Barkin's interests turned to collaborative endeavors, real-time interactive music-making, out of which emerged UCLA's Experimental Workshop. She joined UCLA's Javanese and Balinese Gamelan ensembles and made five trips to Bali and Java to study new music for gamelan under the auspices of a University of California Pacific Rim Research Grant with colleagues Linda Burman-Hall, Sue Carole DeVale, and David Cope. In 1989 Barkin, Benjamin Boretz and James K. Randall co-founded the Open Space music publications series.

Barkin published books and professional articles in journals including Perspectives of New Music.

== Personal life and death ==
In 1957 she married writer, editor, and computer programmer George J. Barkin (1928–2020). They had three sons: Victor, Jesse, and Gabriel.

Elaine Barkin died on February 22, 2023, at the age of 90.

== Works ==
Principal compositions

- Four Short Pieces for Piano (1955)
- Chaconne Variations for Orchestra (MFA thesis, 1956)
- Essay for Orchestra (1957)
- Refrains, flute, clarinet, violin, viola, violoncello, celeste (1967)
- Six Compositions for Piano (1968)
- String Quartet (PhD thesis, 1969)
- Plus ça change, string orchestra and percussion (1971)
- PRIM Cycles, flute, clarinet, violin, violoncello (1972)
- Sound Play, solo violin (1974)
- Mixed Modes, bass clarinet, violin, viola, violoncello, piano (ISCM-NYSCA commission) (1975)
- For Suite's Sake, harpsichord (for Fred Hammond) (1975)
- Inward & Outward Bound, chamber orchestra (1975)
- String Trio (1976)
- Plein Chant, solo alto flute (for Anahid Nazarian) (1977)
- EbbTide, two vibraphones (1977)
- Two Emily Dickinson Choruses for Donn Weiss and the UCLA Madrigal Singers (1977)
- "...the supple suitor...", song cycle, Emily Dickinson texts; mezzo-soprano, flute, oboe, violoncello, harpsichord/piano, vibraphone/bells (NEA commission) (1978)
- "...the sky...", SSA and piano; E. E. Cummings' texts for Robert Tusler and the UCLA Women's Choral Society (1978)
- De Amore, mini-opera based on love texts from the 12th to the 20th century, 4 female, 4 male speaker-singers, viola, guitar, harp, contrabass, slides Rockefeller Foundation Study Center, Bellagio, Italy and MacDowell Colony Residencies (April, May 1980)
- Media Speak, theater piece about nuclear technology, 9 speakers, tape, saxophone, masks and slides – Millay Colony for the Arts (1981)
- N.B. Suite, flutes, contrabass – UCLA College of Fine Arts commission; for Nancy and Bertram Turetzky (1982)
- At the piano, solo piano – written for Gloria Cheng (1982)
- "...to piety more prone...", theater piece, 4 women readers, 4-track tape collage (1982)
- Anonymous was a woman, 4-track tape collage, for dancer Annamaura Silverblatt (1984)
- Still Life :CPEBS, jazz baritone saxophone, vibraphone – for Carl Pritzkat (1984)
- On the way to becoming (a soliloquy), 4-track tape collage on original text (1985)
- Past is part of, 4-track tape collage on original text (1985)
- 3 Rhapsodies, flutes, clarinet – for Catherine Schieve and Robert Paredes (1986)
- OutBack, 4-track tape collage – for Peggy Circerska and 2 dancers (1987)
- Anything Goes – in memoriam Abraham Schwadron; 4-track tape collage (1987)
- Encore for Javanese gamelan (1988)
- "...out of the air...", basset horn, tape – written for Georgina Dobrée (1989)
- To Whom It May Concern #2 4-track tape collage; textline by Benjamin Boretz (1989)
- Legong Dreams, solo oboe (1990)
- Social Contracts, theater piece, texts, five improvising players (1990)
- Exploring the Rigors of In Between & Coming Apart at the Seams, flute, French horn, violin, viola, violoncello (Southern California Music Librarians Association commission) (1991)
- Kotekan Jam, conceived for the University of Oregon's Pacific Rim Balinese Gamelan (1991)
- continuous, texts designed to stimulate interactive music-making (1992)
- Gamelange, harp, mixed gamelan, hand percussion – written for Sue DeVale and the UCLA New Music Gamelan Band (1993)
- "...for my friends' pleasure...", harp and soprano – written for Sue DeVale and Amy Catlin-Jairazbhoy, texts by Sappho, Sue DeVale, bell hooks, Santal girl, Emily Dickinson (1995)
- Touching all Bases/Di Mana-mana, collaboratively composed with I Nyoman Wenten for Basso Bongo & Gamelan; Meet the Composer Commission (1996)
- Lagu Kapal Kuning (Song of the Yellow Boat) for Balinese gamelan angklung (1996)
- Poem for Tom Lee and the UCLA Symphonic Wind & Percussion Ensemble (1999)
- Song for Sarah solo violin – written for and with Mark Menzies (2001)
- Ode, 16 woodwinds and percussion (2001–02)
- Ballade, solo violoncello and voice (2002–04)
- Tambellan Suite for Ron George and his Tambellan (2003–04)
- Warna/Colors for Balinese and Javanese Gamelan, in memoriam Leonard Stein (2003)
- Purnama, Cut Short, Step by Step, From the Abbeys, MIDI pieces (2004)
- Faygele's Footsteps, MIDI dulcimer, sitar, gamelan, harp, piano (2005)
- Inti Sari for Loyola Marymount's gamelan angklung (2005)
- Easy Pieces for Harp for Sue Carole DeVale (2005–06)
- Piano Suite [Prelude, Umbrella Steps, Sara's Dance, When the Wind Blows] (2007)
- 5 Little Machine Pieces [Barely There, Whorl, IF, ShadowPlay, Ending] (2007–08)
- Violin Duo & 3 Little Violin Duets (2007)
- 6 Pieces for Piano (2008)
- XTET: Last Dance for Milton, MIDI pianos, celesta, harpsichord, organ, drum set – for the Open Space/Perspectives of New Music Milton Babbitt Memorial CD (2011)
- Fidl Trio (+1) (in memoriam Paul Des Marais), 2 violins, contrabass + (2012)

Publishers: Mobart Music; Association for the Promotion of New Music; American Gamelan Institute; Yelton-Rhodes Music < www.yrrmusic.com >

Recordings: cassettes, CDs, videos

- String Quartet, Composers Recordings, Inc./New World Records, NWCRL 338 (American Composers Alliance Recording Award, 1974).
- Two Dickinson Choruses, Composers Recordings, Inc./New World Records, NWCRL 482.
- Plein Chant, Composers Recordings, Inc./New World Records, NWCRL 513. Participant on two Interplay tape cassettes: #10 & #32.
- 5 Tape Collage Pieces, Anonymous was a Woman, on the way to becoming, past is part of, Out Back, & To Whom it May Concern #2, Open Space CD 3.
- ee2: A Sound Album: Sounds Words Music Collages by Elaine Barkin, Tildy Bayar, Renee Coulombe, and collaborators, Open Space CD 12.
- Electronic, Instrumental and Vocal Music by Elaine Barkin, Emma Carle, Judith Exley, Mara Helmuth, Open Space CD 16.
- 4 MIDI Pieces on JK Randall 3-CD set, Open Space CD 21.
- Elaine Barkin: Blanc, MIDI Suite, Violin Duo; Dorota Czerner, reading her own poetry, Open Space CD 24.
- Song for Sarah, XTET, Aria for harp, ERB for AVB's 65th; poetry of / read by Dorota Czerner; music of Benjamin Boretz, Open Space CD 29.
- New Music in Bali (a video featuring rehearsals and performances of music of 3 Balinese composers, edited by ERB & Grace M) (1993)
- New Music in Bali; cassette with music of 3 Balinese Composers, produced by Elaine Barkin and Linda Burman-Hall, (UC Pacific Rim Grant) (1994).
- I Wayan Ssuweca: "It All Comes from Inside", Balinese Master Musician (a video edited by ERB & Grace M) (1994)

Books and articles

- File: a collection (texts, photos, graphics by Elaine Barkin, JK Randall, Robert Paredes, Jane Coppock, Benjamin Boretz), 1987.
- e : an anthology : music texts & graphics (1975–1995) (endpaper by Benjamin Boretz), Open Space, 1997.
- Audible Traces: gender, identity and music. Edited by Elaine Barkin & Lydia Hammesley. Carciofoli Press, 1999.
- e2 : an anthology : music texts & graphics 1980–2020] : 'Are we nearly there?', edited by Mark So, Open Space, 2020.

Barkin has published reviews, analyses, speculative texts, interviews, commentaries, and graphics in Perspectives of New Music, The Musical Quarterly, Music Review, Contemporary Music Newsletter, Journal of Music Theory, Balungan, Journal of the Arnold Schoenberg Institute, American Music, Grove Dictionary of American Music and Grove Online, Sonus, Intercultural Music, News of Music, G.E.M.S. Online Journal, the Journal of the International Alliance for Women in Music, and The Open Space Magazine.
