= Arnold Whittall =

British musicologist (1935–2026)

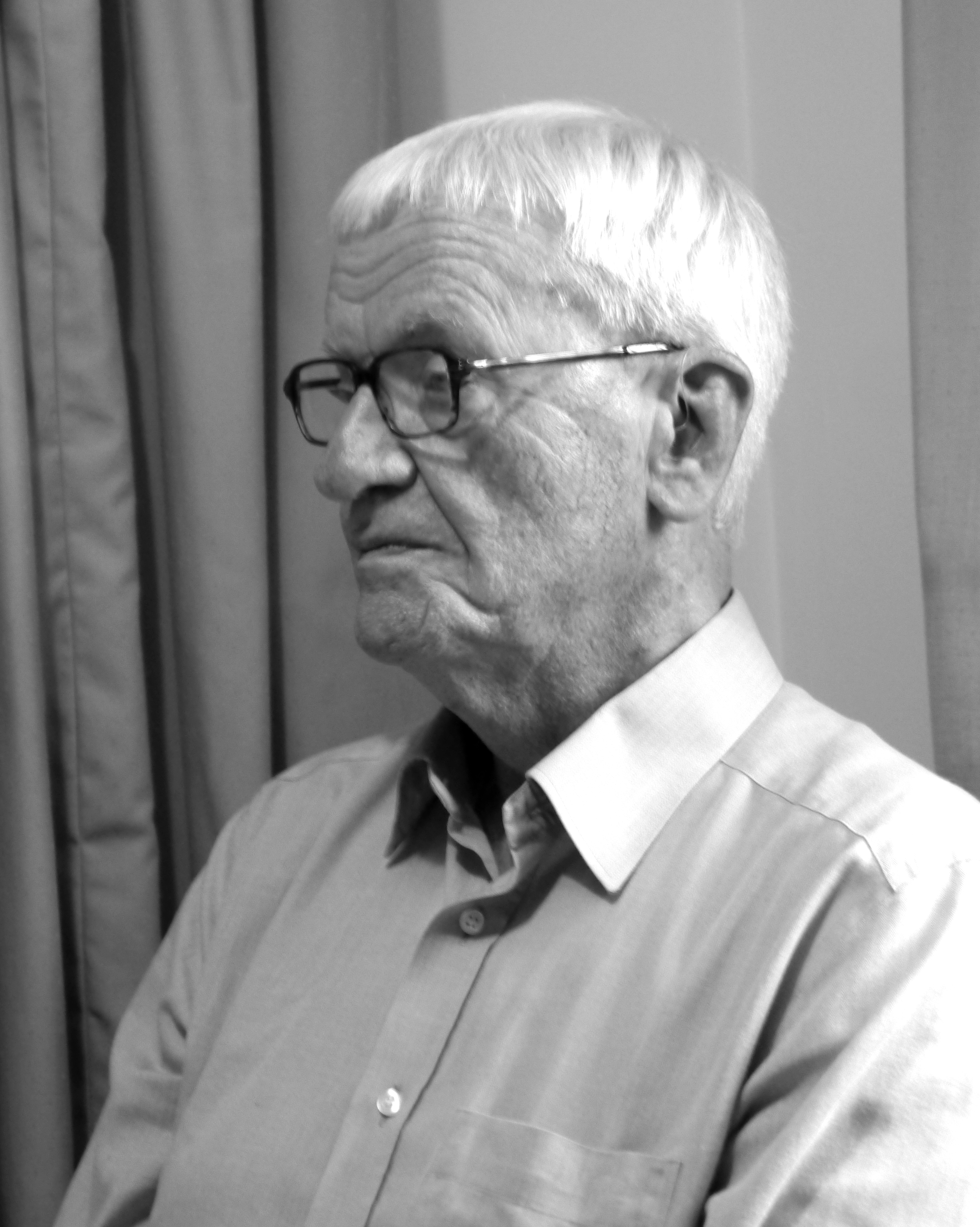
- Whittall in c. 2015
- Born: Arnold Morgan Whittall; 11 November 1935; Shrewsbury, Shropshire, England
- Died: 26 May 2026 (aged 90)
- Occupations: Musicologist, academic
- Spouse: Mary Pigg (m. 1964; died 2005)

Academic background
- Education: The Priory Grammar School for Boys
- Alma mater: Emmanuel College, Cambridge (BA, MA, PhD)
- Thesis: La Querelle des Bouffons (1963)

Academic work
- Discipline: Musicology
- Sub-discipline: 20th-century classical music; 21st-century classical music
- Institutions: University of Nottingham (1964–1969); Cardiff University (1969–1975); King's College London (1975–1996)
- Notable students: Jim Samson, Norma Tyer, V. Kofi Agawu, Jonathan Cross, Anthony Pople, Ruth Tatlow, Adrian Thomas

Arnold Morgan Whittall (11 November 1935 – 26 May 2026) was a British musicologist who specialised in 20th- and 21st-century classical music. In particular, his academic work focused on the theory and analysis of music, modernism, and musical style and structure in the works of Richard Wagner. He was an emeritus professor of musical theory and analysis at King's College London.

Whittall was also a prolific author of non-academic articles on new music. These include record reviews for Gramophone and the Western Mail.

== Background ==
Arnold Whittall was born in Shrewsbury, Shropshire, on 11 November 1935. He was educated at Priory Grammar School, Shrewsbury (1946–1954), and studied the organ as a pupil of J. Eric Hunt. After National Service, he matriculated at Emmanuel College, Cambridge, in 1956. There he read for the Tripos History in Part I, and Music in Part II, and graduated BA in 1959, MA in 1963. He received his PhD in 1964, for a dissertation on the Querelle des Bouffons.

Whittall began his teaching career as Assistant Lecturer at the Cambridgeshire College of Arts and Technology (1962–1964), then as Lecturer at the University of Nottingham (1964–1969). As Senior Lecturer at Cardiff University (1969–1975), he founded the journal Soundings in 1970.

In 1975 Whittall was appointed Reader in Music, and from 1982 Professor of Musical Theory and Analysis, at King's College London. He taught for the MMus degree in Music Analysis, and supervised PhD dissertations, as well as contributing to undergraduate courses. That year, Whittall and Jonathan Dunsby founded the journal Music Analysis, with Dunsby as the founding editor.

In 1985 Whittall was a Visiting Professor at Yale University. He retired from King’s College in 1996.

== Teaching and students ==
At Nottingham in the late 1960s Whittall pioneered an MA degree course in Contemporary Music (e.g. Lutyens, Messiaen) with emphasis on analysis. Colin Matthews, Graham Hair and Alan Bullard were students there. Bullard found both a "rigorous academic timetable" and an eclectic approach to composition. Whittall further developed his teaching at Cardiff with the course MA in the Analysis of Modern Music. Jim Samson graduated Cardiff (MMus; PhD 1972); and Australian composer Norma Tyer took the MA (Wales) course there, graduating in 1973.

Brenda Ravenscroft, who took a Master's course at King's College London in the 1980s, recalled that Whittall

[...] discussed the ways in which aspects of musical structure may offer insights into a composer's reaction to their society and its cultural climate.

Other students that Whittall taught or advised include: V. Kofi Agawu, Jonathan Cross, Anthony Pople, Keith Potter, Ruth Tatlow (with Ulrich Siegele), and Adrian Thomas. Whittall continued part-time teaching there until 2012.

== Views on Wagner ==
Over a number of years Whittall wrote a series of substantial articles on each of Richard Wagner's music dramas from Der fliegende Holländer to Parsifal. Originally published in The Wagner Journal and Musical Times, these essays were gathered into The Wagner Style (2015) (see above). The essays concentrate on technical and stylistic qualities, rather than sources, sketches or historical aspects.

Whittall's 2008 book chapter "Criticism and analysis: current perspectives" was called "a recent overview of the history of Wagner analysis". He contributed articles on "Wagner's Later Stage Works" to the New Oxford History of Music (vol. 9: Romanticism) and on Wagner's musical language and modernistic tendencies to The Wagner Compendium. He contributed to the ENO/Royal Opera guide to Die Meistersinger von Nürnberg, and the Cambridge Opera Handbook on Parsifal and wrote entries on such terms as "leitmotif" and "music drama", for the New Grove Dictionary of Opera and The Cambridge Wagner Encyclopedia. There is a chapter on Liszt and Wagner in his own Romantic Music: A Concise History.

The concluding essay in The Wagner Style, "Wagner and 21st-century Opera", also originating in Musical Times, positioned Wagner as an "early modernist". Whittall specified that he refers in this way to "balancing centripetal against centrifugal forces", in the music dramas, referencing the 1879 essay "Über die Anwendung der Musik auf das Drama". Engaged with current scholarship, Whittall's analyses identify a principle of "rhetorical dialectics" in Wagner's works: a tension between continuities engendered by "the art of transition" (as Wagner styled it) and his through-composed forms on the one hand, and discontinuities and disintegration on the other. He commented that it is only in "Über die Anwendung der Musik auf das Drama" that Wagner touched on those "dialectics", and "with tantalising brevity". He examined the disruptive tendencies of Wagner's works in relation to a contemporary composer: on Jonathan Harvey's opera Wagner Dream, he wrote "[...] though set in 1883, [it] might be thought of as the very contemporary site of a confrontation of late modernism and new classisicm [...]".

== Views on 20th- and 21st-century music ==
Whittall also wrote much on twentieth and twenty-first century composers. Schoenberg Chamber Music (1974) addressed general questions about the composer's influence on musical thought and practice: for instance "Why, in his serial works, did he retain forms developed during the years when tonality was central to all music?" Oliver Neighbour called the study "carefully considered". In Music Since the First World War (1977), Whittall paired the modernist tradition headed by Schoenberg and Stravinsky with composers closer to tonal harmony and traditional form schemes. Peter Evans praised Whittall's "detailed tonal analysis" of Nielsen's Fifth Symphony, Vaughan Williams's Sixth Symphony, and the later Sibelius.

Musical Composition in the Twentieth Century (1999) expanded the 1977 text into a "wider overview". Giving emphasis to an interplay of tonal and post-tonal languages, Whittall notes "the sheer diversity of twentieth-century serious styles", a situation allowing music

to be both extremely serious and extremely simple, with a wider appeal for composers like Górecki and Pärt than was conceivable in the more polarized climate prevalent before 1980.

Mervyn Cooke commented on Whittall's dialectical mode of discussion:

various binary oppositions ... tonality versus atonality, synthesis versus juxtaposition, fragmentation versus organicism, simplicity versus artificiality, modernism versus classicism are prominent.

The value of Whittall's theoretical approach, Anthony Gritten considers, is in identifying

the basic tendency for polarities to remain open (in a state of symbiosis) with modernist discourse, and the complementary tendency for them to dissolve (into a synthesis), with modern classicism; and the fluid and ambiguous interaction between these two tendencies.

Whittall's ability to "move swiftly between insights of quite different orders (analytical, historical, biographical, cultural)" was called a signature feature of his narrative voice. In The Music of Britten and Tippett (1982), he attended to both technical topics and expressive orliterary dimensions of songs and operatic dramas. The Cambridge Introduction to Serialism included comment on 34 composers. Whittall described the book as "an introduction in the documentary sense ... an assembly of views from the vast amount of writing on serialism which has appeared in such profusion since the 1920s".

Whittall called for theorists to interpret composers' attempts to "give the concept of tonality a viable contemporaneity". Since the 1980s, he wrote extensively on younger-generation composers, including those exploring spectralist techniques: in George Benjamin's music, "superimposition of different textural layers ensures a harmonic density"; in an Unsuk Chin score, "refinements in pitching ... enhance the sense of subtle blurring of reality and fantasy present side-by-side, that obtains throughout." In British Music Since Britten (2020) he notes "an interest in the use of overtone spectra" in a profile of Julian Anderson.

Whittall addressed New Complexity in relation to Brian Ferneyhough, Michael Finnissy and James Dillon; and in Sam Hayden's works he recognised "the 'complex' category on grounds of intricacy of notation and intensity of expressive atmosphere". Analyzing "expressionistic features" in composers born after 1970 (Morgan Hayes, Stuart MacRae, and Emily Howard), Whittall found retreats from "more extreme varieties of new complexity, recognising that sustaining unsteady states can be even more potentially expressive than the kind of febrile fracturing that dominates in Finnissy or Ferneyhough."

=== Bibliography (selected) ===
- (2001) "Between Polarity and Synthesis: The Modernist Paradigm in Lutosławski’s Concertos for Cello and Piano". In Skowron, Zbigniew, (ed.). Lutosławski Studies. Oxford: Oxford University Press, pp. 244–268
- (2002) "Defusing Dionysus: New Perspectives on The Rite of Spring". Music Analysis, vol. 21, No. 1, pp. 87–104
- (2004) "Individualism and Accessibility: The Moderate Mainstream, 1945–75". In Cook, Nicholas and Pople, Anthony (eds.). Cambridge History of Twentieth-Century Music. Cambridge: Cambridge University Press. pp. 364–394
- (2009) "’A Dark Voice from Within’: Peter Maxwell Davies and Modern Times". In Gloag, Kenneth and Jones, Nicholas (eds). Peter Maxwell Davies Studies. Cambridge: Cambridge University Press. pp. 1–20
- (2011) "Dendritic Designs: Harrison Birtwistle's String Quartet: The Tree of Strings". Musical Times vol. 152, No. 1916, pp. 3–17
- (2012) "The Search for Order: Carter's Symphonia and Late-modern Thematicism". In Boland, Marguerite and Link, John (eds). Elliott Carter Studies. Cambridge: Cambridge University Press, pp. 57–79
- (2013) "Britten and Lutosławski: Taming the 20th-century Avant-garde". Musical Times, vol. 154, No. 1923, pp. 3–19
- (2015) "’Let it Drift’: Birtwistle’s Late-modernist Music Dramas". In Beard, David, Gloag, Kenneth and Jones, Nicholas (eds). Harrison Birtwistle Studies. Cambridge: Cambridge University Press. pp. 1–25
- (2016) "Pierre Boulez and the Suspension of Narrative". In Campbell, Edward and O'Hagan, Peter. Pierre Boulez Studies. Cambridge: Cambridge University Press. pp. 354–372
- (2018) "’Subtle Shifts’: Howard Skempton’s Twenty-first-century Modernism". Tempo, vol. 72 (284). pp. 7–19
- (2019) "Foundations and Fixations: Continuities in British Musical Modernism". In Heile, Björn and Wilson, Charles (eds). Routledge Research Companion to Modernism in Music. Abingdon: Routledge. pp. 353–378
- (2019) "Dreaming the Darkness: Britten, Birtwistle, and Operatic Fantasies". Musical Times, vol. 160, No. 1947, pp. 55–72
- (2021) "Adès at 50: Precarious Poise". Tempo , vol. 75 (298), pp. 7–19
- (2022) "Sam Hayden’s Material Mysteries". Musical Times, vol. 163, No. 1959, pp. 1–22
- (2025) "Boulez: The Legacy". In Campbell, Edward (ed.). Boulez in Context. Cambridge: Cambridge University Press, pp. 370–377

== Personal life ==
Whittall married Mary Pigg (1937–2005) of Puckeridge in 1964, when she was working in the Cambridge University Library. She was educated at Bedford High School and Newnham College, Cambridge, graduating B.A. in 1960. As Mary Whittall, she worked as a professional translator of many academic books from French and German. The couple collaborated on the English translation The Forging of the "Ring" of a book by Curt von Westernhagen.

Whittall died on 26 May 2026, aged 90. Ian Pace remembered him in Gramophone.

== Works ==
Since the 1960s, Whittall contributed to musicology through books and articles and provided chapters to multi-authored books. Allen Forte called him "the dean of British music analysis".

Whittall's initial publications focussed on Benjamin Britten before shifting to 20th-century music more generally. Other publications have addressed discussions within musicology such as semiotics and modernisms. He found "early representations of urban environment" in works by Anton Webern and Arnold Schoenberg. He wrote about Howard Skempton and Michael Finnissy.

In addition to acting as music adviser to Cambridge University Press, Whittall was also General Editor of the book series "Music in the Twentieth Century", subsequently re-titled "Music since 1900".

Whittall made many broadcasts for BBC Radio 3. When the BBC innovated with its "College Concerts" series, initially free concerts of 20th century music in music colleges, Whittall made introductions to the broadcasts from 1979 to 1983.

=== Bibliography ===
A comprehensive listing of Whittall's writings 1962 to 1995, is in Robert Adlington, "Arnold Whittall: A Bibliography", Music Analysis vol. 14, Nos. 2–3 (July–October 1995), pp. 141–160).

==== Books ====
- Schoenberg Chamber Music. London: British Broadcasting Corporation, 1972.
- Music since the First World War. London: Dent, 1977.
- The Music of Britten and Tippett – Studies in Themes and Techniques. Cambridge: Cambridge University Press, 1982
- Romantic Music: a concise history from Schubert to Sibelius. London: Thames and Hudson, 1987
- Music Analysis: In Theory and Practice. London: Faber, 1988, with Jonathan Dunsby
- Musical Composition in the Twentieth Century. Oxford: Oxford University Press, 1999. A revision of Music since the First World War.
- Jonathan Harvey. London: Faber, 1999.
- Exploring Twentieth-Century Music: Tradition and Innovation. Cambridge: Cambridge University Press, 2003.
- The Cambridge Introduction to Serialism. Cambridge: Cambridge University Press, 2008.
- The Wagner Style: Close Readings and Critical Perspectives. London: Plumbago Books, 2015. See below.
- British Music after Britten. Woodbridge: Boydell and Brewer, 2020.
- Schoenberg: 'Night Music' - Verklärte Nacht and Erwartung. Cambridge: Cambridge University Press, 2023.

==== Wagner studies ====
- (1981). "The Music". In Beckett, Lucy (ed.). Richard Wagner: 'Parsifal'. Cambridge Opera Handbook on Parsifal. Cambridge: Cambridge University Press. pp. 61–86.'
- (1983). "A Musical Commentary”". In John, Nicholas (ed.). The Mastersingers of Nuremberg: ENO/ROH Opera Guide. London: John Calder. pp. 15–26.
- (1983) "Wagner's Great Transition? From Lohengrin to Das Rheingold". Music Analysis, vol. 2, No. 3, pp. 269–80
- (1987). "'Liszt and Wagner'", chap. in Romantic Music: a Concise History from Schubert to Sibelius (see above). London: Thames and Hudson, 1987. pp. 81–109.
- (1990). "Wagner's Later Stage Works". In Abraham, Gerald (ed.). New Oxford History of Music (vol. 9: Romanticism). London: Oxford University Press. pp. 257–321.
- (1992). "Musical Language" and "The Birth of Modernism: Wagner's Impact on the History of Music". In Millington, Barry (ed.). The Wagner Compendium: A Guide to Wagner’s Life and Music. London: Thames & Hudson. pp. 248–261 and 393–396.
- (1992) "Analytic Voices: the Musical Narratives of Carolyn Abbate". Music Analysis, vol. 11, No. 1, pp. 95–107.
- (2008). "Criticism and Analysis: Current Perspectives". In Grey, Thomas, (ed.). The Cambridge Companion to Wagner. Cambridge: Cambridge University Press. pp. 276–289.
- (2025). "'Wo sind wir?' Tristan Disorientations". In Vande Moortele, Steven (ed.). Wagner Studies. Cambridge: Cambridge University Press. pp. 9–27.

== Awards and honours ==
In 2013 Whittall was awarded the Derek Allen Prize for musicology by the British Academy, and in 2021 the Pascall Medal, named for Robert Pascall (1944–2018), by the Society for Music Analysis. He was made an honorary member of the Royal Musical Association in 2014.
