= Paul Dirmeikis =

American classical composer

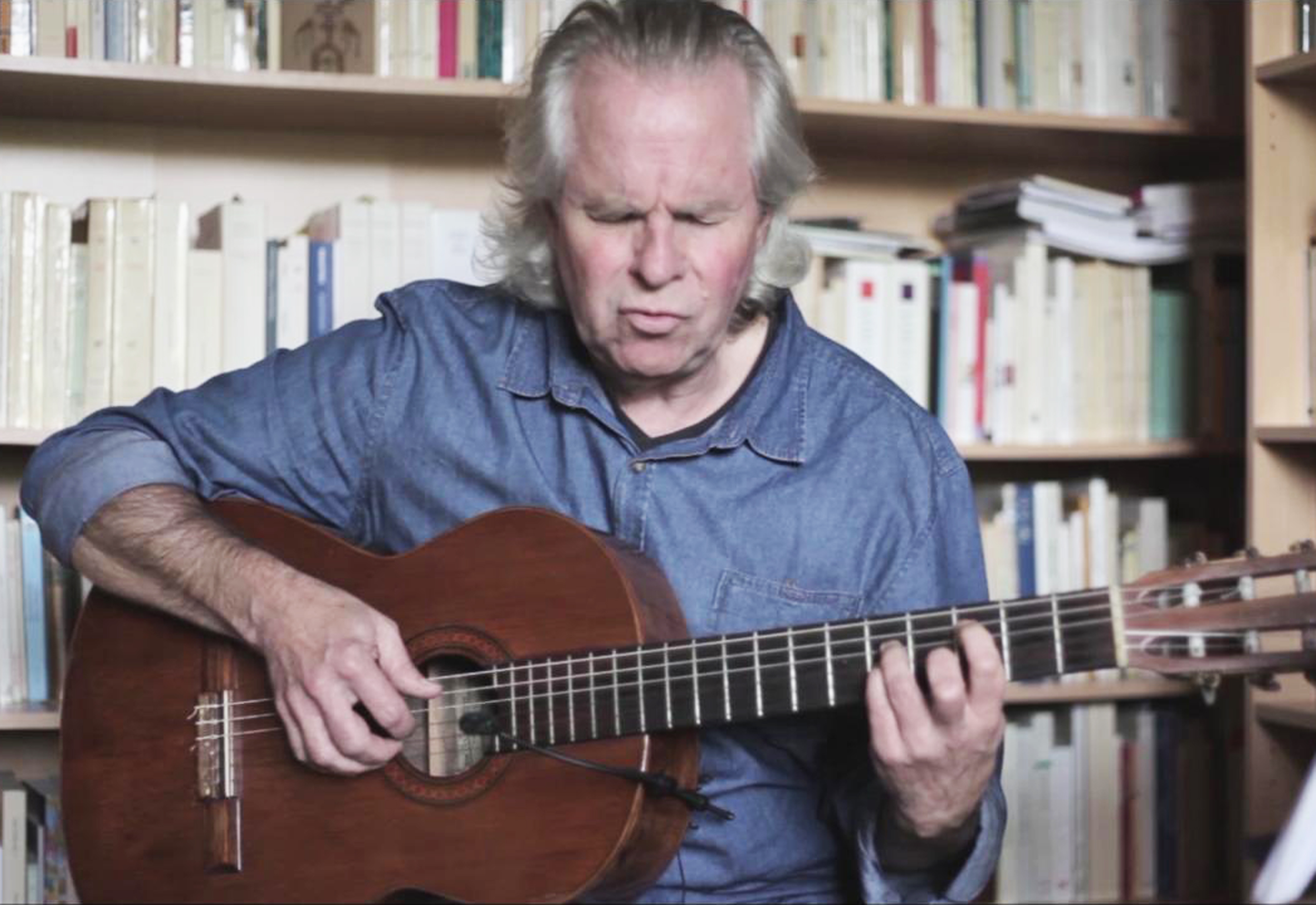

Paul Dirmeikis (born 1954) is a French-speaking poet, composer, singer, and painter who lives in Brittany, France. He is of Lithuanian ancestry, and a member of the Lithuanian Composers Union.

Dirmeikis was born in Chicago, Illinois. As a writer, in the 1990s he began a large cycle of poems inspired by the German composer Karlheinz Stockhausen's entire musical output.

== Works ==
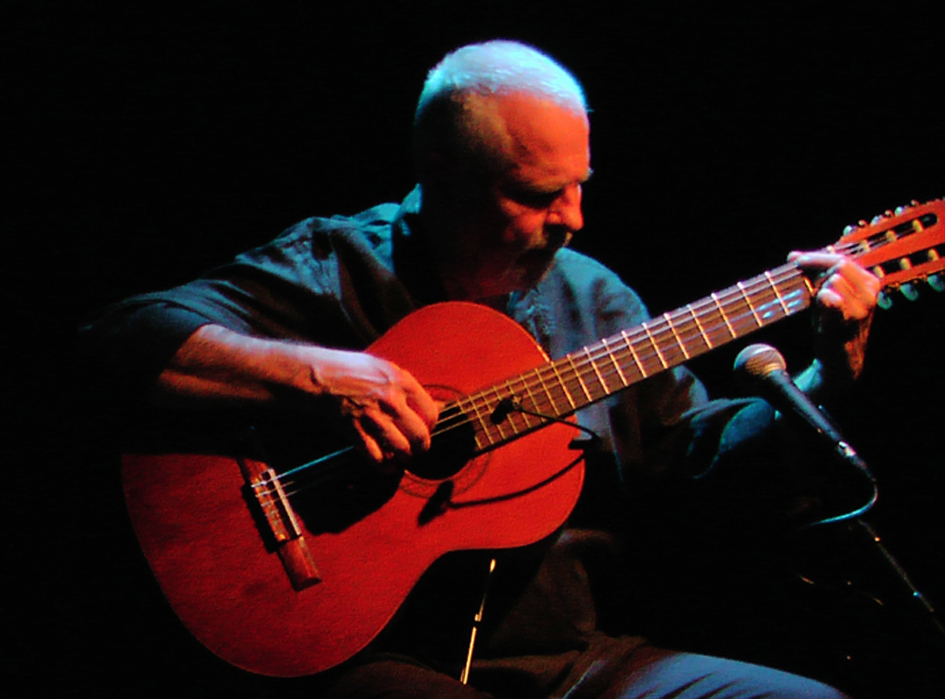
2019

=== Compositions (selective list) ===
Seventy compositions are now listed in his catalogue, including:

- Message laissé à Pondichéry le 18 novembre 1973 (Message Left in Pondicherry on 18 November 1973), for voice, saxophone, electric bass, vibraphone, crystal glasses, percussion, and piano
- Papier à musique (Music Paper), for voice and papers (4 performers)
- Un seul or, for voice, flute, saxophone, electric bass, tampura, and piano
- J. C., for voice, electric guitar, intratonal carillon, and computer-generated sounds (1983)
- String Quartet No. 1, op. 1 (1984)
- Le ciel sous la terre (Heaven in the Earth), String Quartet No. 2, op. 10 (1985)
- Un unique corps (A Unique Body), for overtone singer, flute, tampura, mugaveena, and electric bass
- Nous, les esprits, nous dansons (We, the Spirits, We Dance), for voice, two saxophones, percussion, electric bass, and synthesizer
- Lame d'orage (Storm Blade), for voice, two saxophones, percussion, electric bass, piano, and synthesizer
- Octa, op. 6, for two pianos in quarter tones (1984)
- Le monde dans notre maison (The World in Our House), for voice, flute, saxophone, electric bass, percussion, piano, and synthesizer
- Le serpent, for voice and computer-generated sounds
- Visur (Everywhere), for soprano and computer-generated sounds
- Dienaktis, electronic music for Lithuania (1988)
  - Motina (Mother), op. 18
  - Tevas (Father), op. 19
  - Krastas (Country), op. 20
  - Pavasaris (Spring), op. 21
  - Laikas (Time), op. 22
  - Susisristi (Links), op. 23
  - Gimimas (Birth), op. 24
- Ausra (Dawn), String Quartet No. 3, op. 27 (1996)
- Karma, op. 67, for string quartet and electronic and concrete music (2004) premiered by the Kaunas String Quartet at the "Is Arti" International Contemporary Music Festival in Kaunas
- Entre Parenthèses, 31 songs on poems by René Guy Cadou, for baritone voice and various instrumental ensembles, op. 68 (2005–2007)
- Sukaktuvès (Celebration), op. 70, for 3 oboes, 3 trumpets, and 3 bassoons, op. 70 (2007)
- Aster (Star), op. 71, for wind quintet (2010) premiered by the Quintette à vent de Bretagne

Dirmeikis has been working since 2003 on a 22-part cycle, TAROT, for various instruments and/or electronic and concrete music.

=== Discography ===
- Loup Rouge (LP – 1984) – L'Eveilleur EVE 001
- Message laissé à Pondichéry le 18 novembre 1973 (CD – 1988) – L'Eveilleur EVE 002
- 17 Metacompositions – Electronic and concrete music (Audio DVD – 2002) – L'Eveilleur EVE 003
- Entre Parenthèses – 31 poèmes de René Guy Cadou (2-CD set – 2009) – L'Eveilleur EVE 004

=== Writings ===
- Limbres creusées – poems – Editions St Germain (1975)
- La Peur – short stories – Editions Le Cherche-Midi (1978)
- "Three Poems", Perspectives of New Music 36, no. 2 (Summer 1998): 41–52.
- Le Souffle du temps (Quodlibet pour Karlheinz Stockhausen) – Editions Telo Martius (1999). This is a conversation book with the German composer Karlheinz Stockhausen whom Dirmeikis had known for 30 years.
- L'Epaule d'Orphée – poetry – Foreword by Salah Stétié – Editions L'Eveilleur (2012)
- Gwerz – poetry – Editions L'Eveilleur (2013)
- Les Belles Choses – poetry – Editions L'Eveilleur (2014)
- Je te réunirai – novel – Editions L'Eveilleur (2015)

== Sources ==
=== Works cited ===
- Kazlauskaitė, Ramunė. 2003. "Kompozitorių sąjungos perklausa: kronika". 7MD (Septynios Meno Dienos), no. 556 (21 February; archive from 24 February 2012, accessed 22 December 2016).
- Kohl, Jerome. 1998. "A Seventieth-Birthday Festschrift for Karlheinz Stockhausen (Part Two) (Guest Editor's Introduction)". Perspectives of New Music 36, no. 2 (Summer): 5–11.
