= Dean Rosenthal =

American composer

- Born: Dean Rosenthal; August 27, 1974 (age 52)
- Origin: Concord, Massachusetts
- Genres: 21st-century classical music, Experimental music, Field recording, Electronic music
- Occupations: Composer, musician
- Instruments: guitar, piano, electronics
- Years active: 1996–present
- Labels: Edition Wandelweiser, Tone Glow
- Website: www.deanrosenthal.org www.stonespiece.com

Dean Rosenthal is an American composer of instrumental and electronic music, sound installations, and field recordings. His pieces have included field recordings, text scores, digital pastiche, and instrumental works focussed on natural observations of properties in mathematics such as perfect tilings, combinations, graph theory, and permutations. He has conducted and performed internationally since 1996. Rosenthal is the author of the first oral history of 20th century American experimental music, The American Experimental Music Century. He is the composer of the ongoing international community experimental music work Stones/Water/Time/Breath that was celebrated annually by Fête de la Musique in multiple cities across North America, Europe, and South America and has been performed and broadcast across four continents. He serves as co-editor of The Open Space Web Magazine and is a contributing editor to The Open Space Magazine. He has worked closely with Guggenheim Fellow David Parker's dance company The Bang Group on their collaboration Turing Tests. In 2020, he was commissioned by the Oral History of American Music at Yale to compose a new work on the life of Vivian Perlis. This piece, There Was Only One of Her (Vivian Perlis), was placed in the Rodgers and Hammerstein Archives of Recorded Sound at the New York Public Library for the Performing Arts.

His music is associated with American composers Tom Johnson, John Cage, and Wandelweiser and he has been commissioned to write or arrange his music by the Oral History of American Music collection at Yale, Barbara Galli, Morton Subotnick, the Flexible Orchestra, the Washington Square Winds, and others.

In late 2019, Edition Wandelweiser Records released his first full length recording Stones/Water/Time/Breath. This recording was acquired by the BBC Radio 3 for their music archives in 2020. Dean Rosenthal conducted, produced, and released a live concert of the music The Great Learning by Cornelius Cardew with the Montréal Scratch Orchestra ensemble to critical acclaim in 2021. Underpinnings, was released as part of a compilation of postminimalism in 2007 and he has contributed to recording projects on the Another Timbre and Motor Image labels of the music of Joseph Kudirka and Wandelweiser composer Manfred Werder. Our Gazes, a round for 2 voices that sets the poetry of American poet Henry Lyman is published in Rounds Unbound by Frog Peak Music. His music is performed, broadcast, and choreographed internationally in North America, South America, Europe, Asia, and Australia, including performances of his music at Incubator Arts Project, Spectrum, Brooklyn Museum, Symphony Space and other prominent venues in New York City, Ohrenhoch der Geräuschladen and O Tannenbaum in Berlin, Elastic Arts Foundation in Chicago, the Taipei Contemporary Art Center in Taiwan, and dozens of other venues and sites nationally and internationally, reaching over 23 countries. He lives on Martha's Vineyard.

== List of works ==
- Katama Path for solo instrument with drone (2022)
- There Was Only One of Her (Vivian Perlis) fixed media (2020)
- The Orderly Organ for organ (2018)
- Orderly Movements for oboe trio (2017)
- Ostinato Obbligato for piano (2017)
- The Name of the Street You Live On for piano (2016)
- Island (2015) electroacoustic
- Path (for Flexible Orchestra) for chamber orchestra (2015)
- Path for oboe or clarinet (2014)
- Stones/Water/Time/Breath (2012)
- Duplets for voice (2012)
- I Think So, Too for wind quintet (2009/2012)
- Unconfirmed Report (2011)
- Perfect for ... for violin (2011)
- Menemsha Village field recording/electronic (2010)
- Lullaby for piano (2010)
- Life Is What Happens, digital pastiche (2010)
- One for Karin for piano
- Our Gazes for two voices with text by Henry Lyman (2009)
- Ariel for string quartet or choir Sylvia Plath (2003, 2009)
- This Is My Message to the World for guitar and voice with text by Emily Dickinson (2003)
- In Just Spring… for two violin and voice with text by E. E. Cummings (2003)
- Songs from the Japanese for soprano and violin (1999–2000)
- Embodied Naked for soprano or tenor, piano, violin and cello einem with text by Elliot Wolfson (1998)
- Underpinnings for chamber orchestra based on a painting by Jasper Johns (1998)
- Your Fine Promises for soprano and piano with text by Fujiwara no Mototoshi translated by Kenneth Rexroth (1997)
- Portraits digital pastiche (1997)
- Ear Trainer electroacoustic (1996)
