= Jonathan Cross =

Jonathan or Jon Cross may refer to:

- Jonathan Cross (footballer), English footballer
- Jonathan Cross (academic), British musicologist
- Jon Cross (politician), former member of the Ohio House of Representatives
