= Anthony Pople =

British musicologist (1955–2003)

Anthony John Leonard Pople (18 January 1955 – 10 October 2003) was a British musicologist and writer. He is known for his technological approach to musicology and music analysis. During his career, Pople held professorships at Lancaster University, University of Southampton and University of Sheffield. He also served as the editor of Music Analysis for five years.

== Early life and education ==
Pople was born on 18 January 1955 in Croydon, Surrey. He attended Dulwich College before initially studying mathematics at St John's College, Oxford (SJCO), through an open scholarship. His focus shifted to studies in music at SJCO from 1974 to 1980 where his teachers included Hugh Macdonald, David Lumsden, Denis Arnold, and Derrick Puffett. He pursued a doctorate in music at the University of Oxford. His research, supervised by Arnold Whittall, culminated in his 1985 thesis: Skryabin and Stravinsky 1908–1914: Studies in Analytical Method (republished in 1989 as Skryabin and Stravinsky 1908-1914: Studies in Theory and Analysis).

== Career ==
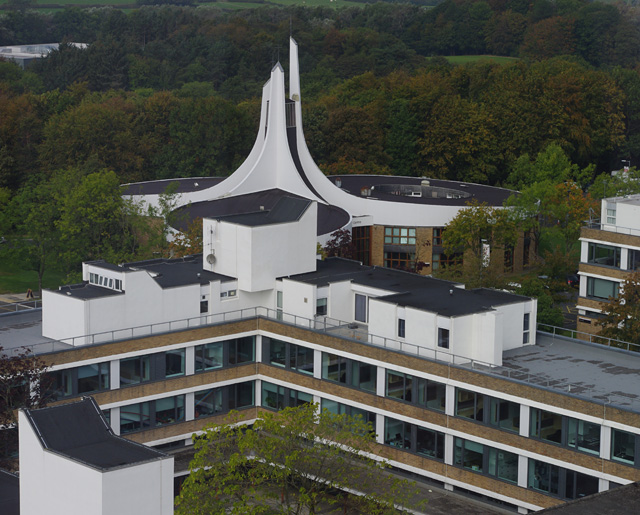
Pople completed much of his work with computer programs while at Lancaster University

Pople began his academic career after graduating from SJCO; initially working as a musicology research fellow (De Velling Willis Fellowship) at the University of Sheffield from 1980 to 1983. He held various professorships in England, at Lancaster University (lecturer 1983–95, professor 1995–97), University of Southampton (1997–99), and University of Nottingham (1999–2003).

During his time at Lancaster, Pople worked with Alan Marsden to implement computer-based music analysis. This led to Pople to develop two computer programs for this purpose in 1994: RowBrowser and SetBrowser. These programs used spreadsheets to input musical notation, which was then analysed by a computer. Pople also created the "Tonalities" project, which is a software package for music analysis. His interest in computers also led him to found the journal Musicus: Computer Applications in Music Education; serving as that publication's first editor from 1989 to 1993 and afterwords as consulting editor from 1993 to 1997.

Aside from teaching positions, Pople was director of the Computers in Teaching Initiative Centre for Music, Lancaster, from 1989 to 1997. He served as the editor of Music Analysis for five years, from 1995. From 1996 until his death he was a member of the consulting board for the journal Musicae Scientiae. He was also a proficient violin player. According to Jonathan Dunsby, Pople was not only an important musicologist, but also "a most gifted composer and performer of music".

Pople's specialist area of musicology was the classical music of the early twentieth century, specifically the Second Viennese School and pre-World War I Russian classical music. His writings focused on music analysis and theory of late tonal and early post-tonal music. He also published on the works of Ralph Vaughan Williams, Michael Tippett and Olivier Messiaen. He authored monographs on Berg’s Violin Concerto (1991) and Messiaen’s Quatuor pour la fin du temps (1998) which are considered authoritative publications on these compositions.

== Personal life ==
Pople married Angela Horrocks in 1988 and they had two daughters. He died from cancer on 10 October 2003 in Nottingham.

== Works ==
=== Books ===
==== Written ====
- Pople, Anthony (1991). Berg: Violin Concerto. Cambridge Music Handbooks. Cambridge University Press. ISBN 9780521399760.
- Pople, Anthony (1998). Messiaen: 'Quatuor pour la fin du temps'. Cambridge Music Handbooks. Cambridge University Press. ISBN 9780521585385.

==== Edited ====
- Pople, Anthony, ed. (1994). Theory, Analysis and Meaning in Music. Cambridge University Press. ISBN 9780521452366.
- Pople, Anthony, ed. (1997). The Cambridge Companion to Berg. Cambridge University Press. ISBN 9780521564892.
- Cook, Nicholas; Pople, Nicholas, eds. (2004). Cambridge History of Twentieth-Century Music. Cambridge University Press. ISBN 9781107631991.

==== Chapter(s) in ====
- Pople, Anthony (1995). "Messiaen's Musical Language: an Introduction". The Messiaen Companion. Faber and Faber. pp. 15–50. ISBN 9780571170333.
- Pople, Anthony (1996). "Misleading Voices: Contrasts and Continuities in Stravinsky Studies". Analytical Strategies and Musical Interpretation. Cambridge University Press. pp. 271–287. ISBN 9780521462495.
- Pople, Anthony (1996). "Vaughan Williams, Tallis, and the Phantasy Principle". Vaughan Williams Studies. Cambridge University Press. pp. 47–80. ISBN 9780521480314.
- Pople, Anthony (1999). "From Pastiche to Free Composition: R. O. Morris, Tippett and the Development of Pitch Resources in the Fantasia Concertante on a Theme of Corelli". Tippett Studies. Cambridge University Press. pp. 27–54. ISBN 9780521592055.
- Pople, Anthony (2001). "Styles and languages around the turn of the century". The Cambridge History of Nineteenth-Century Music. Cambridge University Press. pp. 601–620. doi:10.1017/CHOL9780521590174.022. ISBN 9780521590174.
- Pople, Anthony (2004). "Modeling Musical Structure". Empirical Musicology: Aims, Methods, Prospects. Oxford University Press. pp. 127–156. doi:10.1093/acprof:oso/9780195167498.003.0007. ISBN 9780195167498.

=== Other ===
- Pople, Anthony (1985). Skryabin and Stravinsky 1908–1914: Studies in Analytical Method (PhD thesis). University of Oxford.
