= Benjamin Boretz =

American composer and music theorist (born 1934)

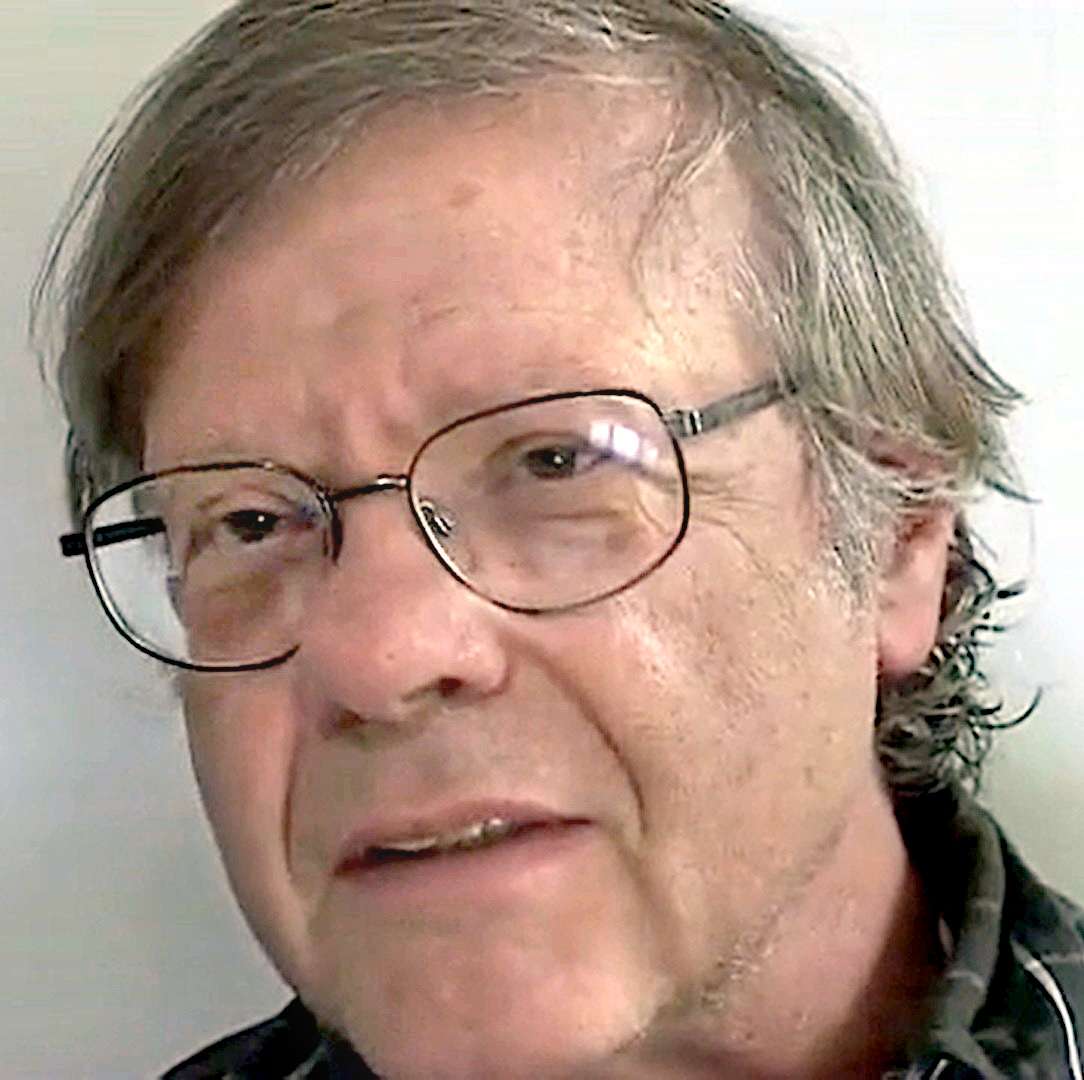
Benjamin Boretz c.2003

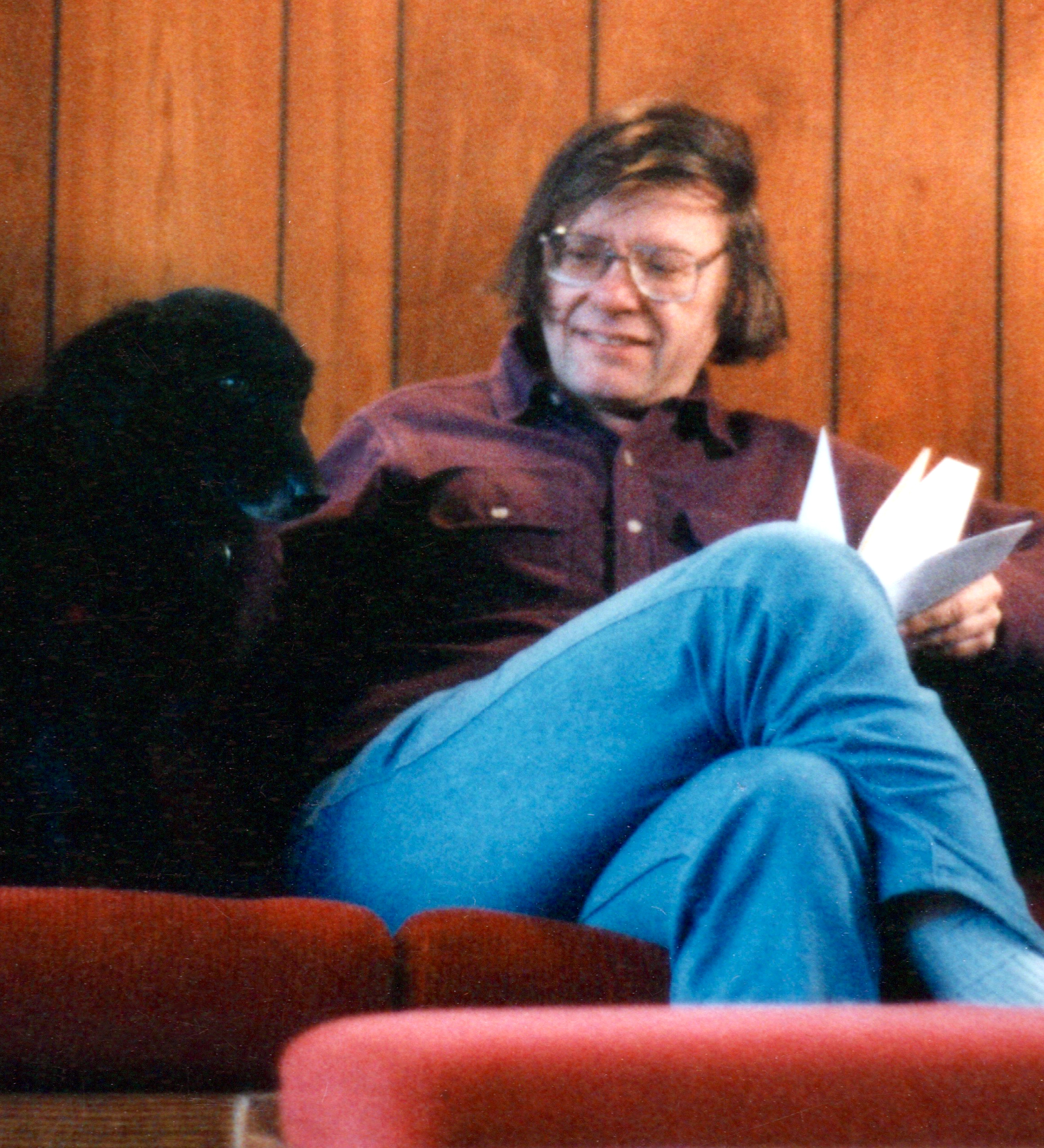
Boretz at the house of J.K. Randall, Princeton, N.J., circa 1981.

Benjamin Aaron Boretz (born October 3, 1934) is an American composer and music theorist.

== Life and work ==
Benjamin Boretz was born in Brooklyn, New York, to Abraham Jacob Boretz and Leah (Yullis) Boretz. He graduated with a degree in music from Brooklyn College in 1954 and studied composition with Tadeusz Kassern, then with Arthur Berger and Irving Fine at Brandeis University, with Darius Milhaud at the Aspen Music Festival and School, with Lukas Foss at UCLA, and with Milton Babbitt and Roger Sessions at Princeton University.

Boretz was one of the first composers to work with computer-synthesized sound (Group Variations II, 1970–72). In the late 1970s and 1980s he converged his compositional and pedagogical practices in a project of real-time improvisational music-making, culminating in the formation at Bard College of the music-learning program called Music Program Zero, which flourished until 1995.

He has written extensively on musical issues, as critic, theorist, and musical philosopher, from the perspective of a practicing composer. His earliest large-scale music-intellectual essay was the book-length "Meta-Variations, Studies in the Foundations of Musical Thought" (1970), which addresses the epistemological questions involved in the cognition and composition of music, and propounds a radically relativistic/individualistic/ontological reconstruction of the musical creative process. His text composition "Language, as a Music, Six marginal Pretexts for Composition" (1978) engaged questions of the origin and nature of language and meaning as they might be conceived from the perspective of music.

Boretz has taught in the music departments of a number of American universities, including Brandeis, UCLA, UC Berkeley, Princeton University, University of Chicago, NYU, Columbia University, University of Michigan, Bard College, UC Santa Barbara, Evergreen College, and University of Southampton (UK, as a visiting Fulbright Professor). See: List of music students by teacher: A to B#Benjamin Boretz.

Boretz and Arthur Berger founded the composers' music journal Perspectives of New Music, and Boretz was The Nation's principal music critic (1962–1970). In 1988, he, Elaine Barkin, and James K. Randall founded Open Space to publish recordings and scores and, in 1999, with Mary Lee A. Roberts, The Open Space magazine, which he edits with Dorota Czerner, Tildy Bayar, Jon Forshee, Dean Rosenthal, and Arthur Margolin.

He has two children, Avron and Nina.

== Recordings ==
Boretz's work as composer and writer is available on CDs, DVDs, and print books issued by Open Space Publications, a cooperative formed by Boretz with Elaine Barkin and James K. Randall.

== Principal Compositions ==
- Concerto Grosso for String Orchestra (1954)
- Two Holy Sonnets of John Donne (1954)
- Nocturne for String Orchestra (1955)
- Partita for Piano (1955)
- Leda and the Swan (Rilke) for alto voice, 2 cellos, flute (1955)
- Divertimento for chamber ensemble (1955–56)
- Violin Concerto (1956)
- Overture to "Jezebel" (1956)
- String Quartet (1957–58)
- 2 musics for lukas foss (piano 4 hands) (1957)
- Donne Songs for soprano and piano (1959)
- Group Variations I for chamber orchestra (1964–67)
- Group Variations II for computer (version 1, 1972; 2, 1994; 2.1, 2005)
- Liebeslied, for a pianist alone (unfinished)(1974)
- (“...my chart shines high where the blue milk’s upset...”) for solo piano (1976–77)
- Language, as a music / six marginal pretexts for composition for speaker, piano, prerecorded tape (1978)
- Passage, for Roger Sessions at 80 for piano (1979)
- Converge for ensemble (soundscore) (1980)
- Talk: If I am a musical thinker (paperpiece) (1982)
- Elie: The Dance (four-track tape) (1986)
- forM (a music) (four-track tape) (1986)
- to open I (four-track tape) (1986)
- please think (ensemble collage) (1986)
- to open II (piano, ensemble, tape) (1987)
- Invention (piano four hands) (1988)
- 30 Inter/Play realtime sound sessions (1981–88)
- ONE, eight pianosolo soundsessions (1985)
- The River Between (2 keyboard sound session with Richard Teitelbaum) (1987)
- Sugar, Free (with Wadada Leo Smith) (1988)
- Lament for Sarah (piano soundscore) (1989)
- Scores for Composers (1988–1992)
- Dialogue for JKR (piano soundscore) (1990)
- Kivapiece, for and about John Silber (textscore) (1991)
- The Purposes and Politics of Engaging Strangers (for 2 performers) (1991)
- gendermusic for computer (1994)
- music/consciousness/gender (live and recorded speakers, prerecorded music, video images) (1994)
- echoic/anechoic (soundscore for piano) (1997)
- Black /Noise I (for computer) (1998)
- Black /Noise III (video images, computer) (1998)
- Music, as a Music (performance piece for speaker and video) (1998(
- UN(-) for chamber orchestra (1999)
- I/O for two speakers (2001)
- O for piano (2001)
- O for electric guitar (arranged by Mary Lee Roberts) (2002)
- Ainu Dreams (piano soundscore) (2002)
- Postlude (Movement III of String Quartet) (2004-5)
- Downtime for piano and electronic percussion (2005)
- The Memory of All That. A Holy Sonnet of John Donne for Milton Babbitt (1916–2011) (2011)
- Qixingshan for String Quartet (2007–2008; 2010–2011)
- Caves (with dorota czerner) (2009)
- St. Andrews' Night (with dorota czerner) (2011)
- fireflies (with dorota czerner) (2012)
- With respect to George (a postcard for George Quasha at 70) for vibraphone solo (2012)
- ("...The sun poured molten glass on the fields...") for piano (for Robert Morris at 70) (2014)
- Fantasy on an improvisation by Jim Randall (in memoriam jkr) for the Cygnus Ensemble (2014)
- Looking (electronic) for images by Linda Cassidy (2016–17)
- One on One for solo clarinet (2017)
- A Question, A Rose for violin alone (2018)

== Principal writings (published) ==
Books:

- Language, as a music. Six marginal pretexts for composition. for speaker, prerecorded tape, and piano (1978). Lingua Press, 1980
- Talk: If I am a musical thinker. (1980) Station Hill Press, 1984
- Music Columns from The Nation, 1962–70; selected and edited, and with an introduction by, Elaine Barkin. Open Space Publications, 1988
- Meta-Variations. Studies in the Foundations of Musical Thought. (1970) Open Space Publications, 1994
- Being About Music. Textworks 1960-2003 (with J. K. Randall). Volume 1: 1960-1978; Volume II: 1978-2003. Open Space Publications, 2003
- Inside in...outside out. Edited by Tildy Bayar. Introduction by David Lidov. Afterwords by Charles Stein, John Rahn, Joshua Banks Mailman, Jon Forshee, Robert Morris (composer), Arthur Margolin and Scott Gleason, Dorota Czerner. Open Space Publications, 2020

Articles published: in journals: The Open Space Magazine; Musical America; Musical Quarterly; Harper's; The Nation; Perspectives of New Music; Journal of Philosophy; Cimaise; the London Magazine; Journal of Music Theory; Contemporary Music Newsletter; Proceedings of the American Society of University Composers; Proceedings of the International Musicological Society; News of Music; in books: Perspectives on Contemporary Music Theory (W. W. Norton); Perspectives on Musical Aesthetics (W. W. Norton).
