= John Rahn =

American music theorist, composer, bassoonist, and professor of music

John Rahn, born on February 26, 1944, in New York City, is a music theorist, composer, bassoonist, and Professor of Music at the University of Washington School of Music, Seattle. A former student of Milton Babbitt and Benjamin Boretz, he was editor of Perspectives of New Music from 1983 to 1993 and since 2001 has been co-editor with Benjamin Boretz and Robert Morris.

== Forte number and prime form ==
There are three methods of computing Forte number and prime form. Allen Forte published the first in his 1973 book The Structure of Atonal Music, citing a 1961 article by Milton Babbitt. The second was introduced in Rahn's Basic Atonal Theory and used in Joseph N. Straus's Introduction to Post-Tonal Theory, where it was declared that the two algorithms only differed in five cases: 5-20, 6-Z29, 6-31, 7-20, and 8-26.

Forte (1973) and Rahn (1980) both list the prime forms of a set as the most left-packed possible version of the set. Forte packs from the left and Rahn packs from the right ("making the small numbers smaller" versus making "the larger numbers smaller"). Programmers tend to prefer Rahn's method, because the Rahn prime is easily computed by comparing sets in binary, whereas Forte's prime requires a more complex algorithm.

== Bibliography ==
- Forte, Allen (1973). The Structure of Atonal Music. New Haven: Yale University Press. ISBN 0-300-01610-7. LCCN 72091295. OCLC 861792420. OL 5307893M. Wikidata Q130092153.
- Rahn, John (1980). Basic Atonal Theory. New York: Longman. ISBN 0-02-873160-3. OCLC 4857496. OL 13591926M. Wikidata Q130718877.
- Rahn, John (2000). Music Inside Out: Going Too Far in Musical Essays. intro. and comment. by Benjamin Boretz. Amsterdam: G+B Arts International. p. 177. ISBN 90-5701-332-0. OCLC 154331400.
- Rahn, John (1989). "New Research Paradigms", Music Theory Spectrum, xi/1, 84-94.
- Straus, Joseph N. (1990). Introduction to Post-Tonal Theory. Englewood Cliffs: Prentice Hall. ISBN 0-13-686692-1. LCCN 89016089. OCLC 20012239. OL 2196451M. Wikidata Q130718974.
