= Norma Tyer =

Australian composer (born 1928)

Norma Phyllis Tyer (born 23 April 1928) was an Australian composer who wrote orchestral, choral, electronic and chamber music.

== Education and career ==
Tyer was born in Sydney. In 1960, she was one of two students (the other was Ann Carr-Boyd) to graduate from the University of Sydney with a Bachelor of Music Degree. She worked as the managing editor of Music Now for four years, and taught music in public schools and at the University of Sydney.

Tyer received the Frank Albert Post Graduate Traveling Scholarship in 1971 as well as a German scholarship for a course in new music at Darmstadt. This enabled her to spend 15 months studying in Europe, where her teachers included Vinko Globokar, Mauricio Kagel, György Ligeti, Dieter Schnebel, Karlheinz Stockhausen, Christian Wolff, and Iannis Xenakis. She attended the Dartington International Summer School to study with Harrison Birtwistle and Morton Feldman, and work in the electronics studio.

Tyer then earned an M.A. in the analysis of contemporary music from University College in Cardiff, Wales, under Arnold Whittall. While there, she worked in the electronics studio and studied psycho-acoustics in the physics department. Her thesis was about The Church Parables of Benjamin Britten. In 1974, she became a lecturer in Academic Studies at Newcastle Conservatorium of Music, a branch of the New South Wales State Conservatorium of Music, where she remained through at least 1985.

== Compositions ==
Tyer's music was published by Chappell & Co. Her compositions include:

=== Chamber ===
- String Quartet

=== Orchestra ===
- Fantasia on a Theme of Bach
- Franz Josef: Impressions of a Glacier

=== Vocal ===
- Canticle of the Rose (chorus and piano)
- Fragments from the Coventry Corpus Christi Pageants (a cappella chorus)
- Kyrie Eleison (chorus and orchestra)
- Missa Brevis (a cappella chorus)
- New Sunrise (chorus and piano)
- Spring (a cappella chorus)
