= Ruth Tatlow =

British-Swedish Bach scholar, musicologist and writer

Ruth Mary Tatlow (née Ballard) was born in London, England, in 1956, and grew up in Colton, Staffordshire. She is a British-Swedish Bach scholar, musicologist and writer, and since 2023 a visiting researcher at the Academy of Music and Drama, University of Gothenburg.

== Education and career ==
Ruth Tatlow studied at the Royal Academy of Music (1974–78), and spent two years as a freelance clarinettist (1978–1980), winning second prize in the National Clarinet competition (1979). From 1980 she studied musicology at King's College London, gaining a first class BMus in 1983 and the Purcell Prize for the top finalist. She was awarded a PhD in 1987, supervised by Arnold Whittall, and advised in 1985 by Ulrich Siegele (University of Tübingen), with funding through a DAAD scholarship.

Ruth Tatlow's doctoral thesis Lusus Poëticus vel Musicus was published in 1987. Her first monograph, based on the thesis, was published in 1991 as Bach and the Riddle of the Number Alphabet by Cambridge University Press, in paperback in 2006, and in Japanese translation in 2011

Her second monograph, Bach’s Numbers: Compositional Proportion and Significance (Cambridge University Press, 2015), was awarded Choice ‘Outstanding Academic Title 2016’. Her source-based research has raised the awareness of parallel techniques commonly used in the creative arts in Bach’s time, notably the poetical paragram (Bach and the Riddle), the acrostic, inventive use of number, and musical alphabets (Bach’s Numbers, Chapter 2). Her ground-breaking theory of proportional parallelism (Bach's Numbers) has been widely welcomed albeit with some pockets of resistance. It has also stimulated the application of modern statistical methods to this area of musicology.

Popular writing has included programme notes and CD liner notes. In 2000 she wrote for Sir John Eliot Gardiner’s Bach Cantata Pilgrimage (2000), including a series of twelve booklets for Deutsche Grammophon Arkiv Production.

Tatlow has taught musicology in several institutions, including two years at Royal Holloway College (1998–1999, sponsored by a Leverhulme Special Fellowship), Stockholm University (2005–2007), and the Eastman School of Music in Rochester, New York (2010). Numerous research fellowships and awards have facilitated her research and writing, most recently the Swedish Collegium for Advanced Study (Spring 2020). She was appointed a Derek Brewer Visiting Fellow at Emmanuel College, Cambridge, for the Michaelmas Term 2021, and a Visiting Fellow at Clare Hall, Cambridge, for the calendar year 2023. Her current affiliation is at The Academy of Music and Drama, University of Gothenburg.

In 2004 she co-founded Bach Network with Reinhard Strohm and John Butt and has been Chair of the Bach Network Council since 2007. In 2006 she designed and then co-edited twelve annual volumes (2006–2017) of the open access, peer-reviewed journal Understanding Bach and is now co-editor of Discussing Bach. Ruth Tatlow also served on the editorial board of the American Bach Societyfrom 2008 until 2024.

== Publications ==
Books

- Mozart’s La clemenza di Tito: A Reappraisal. Editors: Magnus Tessing-Schneider and Ruth Tatlow. Stockholm: Stockholm University Press, 2018.
- Bach’s Numbers: Compositional Proportion and Significance. Cambridge: Cambridge University Press, 2015.
- Bach and the Riddle of the Number Alphabet. Cambridge: Cambridge University Press, 1991/2006.

Recent online talks

- 15 June 2024 'Analytical Perspectives on the Bach Cantatas', presentation and live discussion with Daniel R. Melamed and John Butt (forthcoming, January 2025).
- 14 June 2023 'The Future of Bach Sources', presentation and live discussion with Manuel Bärwald, Andrew Frampton and Bettina Varwig.
- 20 July 2022 'Bach Cantata Texts, Poetic Techniques, and Meanings', presentation and live discussion with Michael Marissen and Michael Maul.
- 15 July 2021 'Bach and the Corporeality of Emotions', presentation and live discussion with John Butt and Bettina Varwig.
- 9 June 2020 'Bach and Emotion: "Zur Recreation des Gemüths", presentation and live discussion with John Butt and Bettina Varwig.
- 31 March 2020 'Reading Belief through Structural Ordering, 1700-1850', 1700-1850’ given at the Swedish Collegium for Advanced Study.

Selected peer-reviewed book chapters/articles

- ‘Symmetry and a Template: Bach’s Well-Tempered Clavier and Chopin’s 24 Preludes, Opus 28’, in Chopin and the Baroque Tradition, Chopin Institute, Warsaw 2019/2020, 51–86.
- 'Reading Belief through Compositional Unity: A Lutheran Theology of Proportions and Bach’s Response’. Lutherske perspektiver på liturgisk musikk. Oslo, Novus Forlag, 2019, 115–139.
- ‘The Use and Abuse of Fibonacci Numbers and the Golden Section in Musicology Today’, Understanding Bach 1 (2006), 69–85. Published in Hungarian as ‘Hogyan használja (ki) napjaink zenetudománya a Fibonacci-számokat és az aranymetszést?’, translated Gergely Fazekas. Magyar Zene. Hungarian Music Journal of Musicology. 4/2017.
- ‘A Missed Opportunity: Reflections on Written by Mrs Bach,’ Understanding Bach, 10 (2015), 141–157.
- 'Theoretical Hope: A Vision for the Application of Historically Informed Theory’, Understanding Bach 8 (2013), 33–60.
- 'Collections, bars and numbers: Analytical Coincidence or Bach’s design?' Understanding Bach, 2 (2007), 37–58.

== Personal ==
Ruth Tatlow is married to conductor and educator Mark Tatlow. They have three children and four grandchildren.
