= Michael Spitzer =

British musicologist

Michael Spitzer is a British musicologist and academic.

== Early life ==
Michael Spitzer was born in 1966 in Nigeria. He was raised in Israel and, in 1973, emigrated to the UK. He was a refugee of the Yom Kippur War.

He completed his undergraduate studies at Merton College, Oxford, and his doctorate at the University of Southampton (awarded in 1993).

== Career ==
He taught at Durham University, where he was appointed to a readership in 2005; he then moved to the University of Liverpool after the 2009–10 academic year and remains a professor of music there as of 2024. He is a past president and chair of the Society for Music Analysis editorial board.

According to his university profile, he is a specialist in Beethoven "with interests in aesthetics and critical theory, cognitive metaphor, and music and affect."

He inaugurated the International Conferences on Music and Emotion series at Durham in 2009. He co-organized the International Conference on the Analysis of Popular Music (Liverpool, 2013). His publications explore the intersections between music theory, philosophy, and psychology.

== Works ==
Spitzer's book Metaphor and Musical Thought (2004) is among the first two book-length music theory publications on metaphor and music analysis. It distinguishes itself by synthesizing literary metaphor with cognitive-science approaches to metaphor.

== Selected publications ==
- Metaphor and Musical Thought (University of Chicago Press, 2004).
- Music as Philosophy: Adorno and Beethoven's Late Style (Indiana University Press, 2006).
- (Editor) Beethoven (Ashgate, 2015).
- A History of Emotion in Western Music: A Thousand Years from Chant to Pop (Oxford University Press, 2020).
- The Musical Human: A History of Life on Earth, (Bloomsbury, 2021)
- "Can music give you an orgasm? The short answer is yes". Aeon Essays. 18 October 2021.
- Spitzer, Michael. "40,000 years of music explained in 8 minutes". Big Think – via YouTube.
- Spitzer, Michael (September 2009). "Musicology's dialogue with emotion studies: Analysing musical structure". 2009 3rd International Conference on Affective Computing and Intelligent Interaction and Workshops. pp. 1–2. doi:10.1109/ACII.2009.5349502. ISBN 978-1-4244-4800-5. S2CID 15597044.
