= Open Space (publications) =

- Founded: 1988
- Founder: Benjamin Boretz, J.K. Randall, and Elaine Barkin
- Country of origin: United States
- Headquarters location: Red Hook, New York
- Publication types: Books, Compact discs, Magazines, Sheet musics
- Official website: the-open-space.org

Open Space was begun in 1988 in a collaborative effort by Benjamin Boretz, J.K. Randall, and Elaine Barkin. Inspired by the publications of Kenneth Gaburo's Lingua Press whose graphical presentation was far from the typically institutional look of some academic music publications, Open Space began to represent the real-time soundmaking sessions in and around Bard College and Princeton University.

The Open Space Magazine and The Open Space Web Magazine, began in 1999 and Mary Lee Roberts and Tildy Bayar joined the editorial staff. Dorota Czerner became a fellow editor and producer in 2003.

Open Space strives to support the, “…output from a community for people who need to explore or expand the limits of their expressive worlds, to extend or dissolve the boundaries among their expressive-language practices, to experiment with the forms or subjects of thinking or making or performing in the context of creative phenomena. We want to create a hospitable space for texts which, in one way or another, might feel somewhat marginal — or too ‘under construction’ — for other, kindred publications."

When editors Dean Rosenthal, Jon Forshee and Arthur Margolin joined in the late 2000s, Open Space strove to create a purely digital version of The Open Space Web Magazine allowing them to stream multimedia, along with notes, scores and various other kinds of contributions.

In September 2011, Open Space was selected to participate in the Free Music Archive.
