= Vanya Milanova =

Bulgarian violinist (born 1954)

Vanya Milanova (born January 12, 1954; also Vania) is a Bulgarian-born solo violinist, recording artist and professor of music.

== Early life and education ==
Milanova was born in Razgrad, Bulgaria. She was a child prodigy, having performed her first paid concert under the tutelage of Yordan Yordanov at the age of six. She studied at the Music School in Sofia and the State Music Academy in Sofia in the class of Peter Arnaudov, and later at the Guildhall School of Music in London, where she studied with pedagogue Yfrah Neaman.

== Career ==
At an early stage in her career, Milanova won prizes at several of the major international violin competitions: Kocian Violin Competition (Grand Prix for the overall winner), Queen Elisabeth (10th prize; 1971), Paganini (3rd prize; 1973) and Tchaikovsky (joint 3rd prize; 1974).

She has played with orchestras in England, France, Italy, Turkey, Israel, Portugal, Sweden, Norway, Denmark, South America and South Africa. She has made frequent recordings with the BBC – London and Manchester, Norwegian Label Simax, Bulgarian National Radio and the Italian Label Real Sound, and has played at the Royal Festival Hall, Wigmore Hall, the Royal Albert Hall, the Barbican Centre and the Royal Opera House for the Edward Boyle Memorial Concert 1983, attended by Her Majesty the Queen in aid of the Edward Boyle Memorial Trust. She often was the soloist for fundraising events and recitals at the Square Chapel in the 1990s. She performed the Mendelssohn Violin Concerto to positive reviews at the Queen Elizabeth Hall with Hungarian concert pianist and conductor Tamas Vasary in 1982. She often performed with the pianist Jonathan Dunsby.

The Times, reviewing a concert in 1981, praises her 'jewel bright intonation'. Her beauty of tone is also mentioned in The Amadeus: Forty Years in Pictures and Words by Suzanne Rozsa-Lovett, and Beyond the Notes by Stephannie Williams, and her musicality is referenced in Dame Fanny Waterman's autobiography, My Life in Music. Milanova is featured on the front cover of The Strad magazine in January 1982.

She is the first woman to record the entire 24 Paganini caprices, which she did for the Simax Label, Oslo, 1985.

She was violin professor at Bilkent University, Ankara, Turkey (from 2003). She led masterclasses (from 1991) at the Music Academy 'Prof Sasha Popov' during the International 'March Music Days' Festival in Ruse, Bulgaria. She was a jury member for the Tchaikovsky Competition in 1994.

== Awards and honours ==
Milanova has been awarded 'Freedom of the City Award' in her native Bulgaria for her contribution to music, a Golden Feather Award from the Bulgarian Classic FM in 2001 and has been attributed with popularising classical music to a younger generation. She is an honorary member of the Horowitz festival. Milanova has a permanent museum exhibition dedicated to her in Bulgaria as announced by the Bulgarian Telegraph Agency.

== Personal life ==
Vanya Milanova was married to Paul de Keyser, the son of pianist and teacher, Dame Fanny Waterman.
