= James K. Randall =

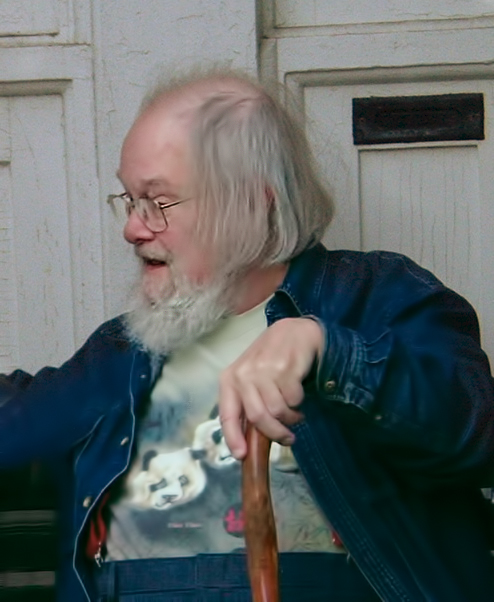
James K. Randall in 2004

James K. Randall (June 16, 1929 - Cleveland, Ohio; May 28, 2014 - Princeton, New Jersey) was an American composer, music theorist, and early adopter of electronic music. At the time of his death he was Professor of Music Emeritus at Princeton University.

== Life and career ==
James Kirtland Randall was born in Cleveland, Ohio to Margaret ("Miggie") Wright Randall and Edwin Templeton Randall. Miggie Randall was a violin teacher at the Cleveland Institute of Music and brought young James up as a music prodigy, with the ambition that he would become a famous piano player. When James was 17, a piano sonata that he composed was played at Carnegie Hall by his teacher, Leonard Shure.

James went on to get a BA at Columbia University, an MA at Harvard University and an MFA at Princeton (studying with Milton Babbitt.) He also taught for four years at the US Navy School of Music while on active duty. He joined the faculty of Princeton University in 1957.

At Princeton, he became a pioneer in electronic music, working from the very early days of punch cards. Music from that time includes Lyric Variations for Violin and Computer, Quartets in Pairs, and Quartersines.

Later, he did a great deal of free-wheeling improvisation, then late in life came back to composing for piano (the GAP series) and MIDI (a garland of Midi, My Prayer for Bella).

Though Randall's music was mostly heard within the small world of academic music, it occasionally reached a wider audience, for instance on the radio show "Schickele Mix":

He also wrote about music, published at first in Perspectives of New Music. Many of his writings took the form of highly experimental prose poems. A typical footnote from Compose Yourself -- A Manual for the Young (1972) reads:

1.) (pfung! ; !pfung(

The publication of Compose Yourself caused a major financial backer to remove his support from Perspectives of New Music. While J.K. Randall's early works were set in conventional type, in his later writings he often used his own calligraphy.

Randall's writings are collected in the 2-volume set Being About Music (with Benjamin Boretz). Much of J.K. Randall's work is published by Open Space and a large collection of his manuscripts and papers is held in the J. K. Randall Collection of the New York Public Library for the Performing Arts.

J.K. Randall was married to Ruth Hochheimer Randall for 62 years. They had 3 children together; Ellen, Thomas, and Beth.

== Compositions ==
- Piano Sonata, 1944
- Suite for Piano, 1946
- Theme and Variations, 1947
- Variations for Cello and Piano, 1949
- Rodeo for Solo Violin, 1953
- Woodwind Quintet in Three Movements, 1953
- Dance for Woodwind Quintet, 1953
- Quartet, 1953
- Music for Brass Sextet, 1953
- Old Song, 1954
- String Trio, 1954
- To You, 1954
- Choral Pieces, 1955
- Five Monologues for Cello, 1955
- Violin Sonata, 1955
- Violin and Viola, 1955
- Slow Movement, 1959
- Improvisation on a poem by e. e. cummings, 1961, rev. 1974
- Pitch-derived Rhythm, 7 Demonstrations, 1961
- For Soprano, Contralto, and Piano, 1961
- Quartets in Pairs, 1964
- Connect, 1965
- Mudgett: Monologues by a Mass Murderer, 1965
- Academic Fugue, 1966
- Lyric Variations for Violin and Computer, 1968
- Quartersines, 1967
- Square 1 & 2, 1968
- Tonvib, 1968
- Trev, 1968
- AA, 1969
- Eakins, music for the film, 1971
- Horsehigh, 1971
- Bessel 3, 1973
- such words as it were vain to close ..., 1974
- From my Diary: a Meditation on Rossignol, 1977
- Troubadour Project, 1977
- Greek Nickel, 1979
- INTER/PLAY [tapes of improvised performances], 1980 - 1990
- Three for Piano, 1991
- Gap 1, 1991
- Gap 2, 1993
- Gap 3, 1994
- Gap 4, 1994
- Gap 5 (in memoriam Leonard Shure), 1994
- The Fish, 1995
- Svejk, 1996
- Nine Salon Pieces for Yamaha DX-100, 1996
- Troubadour Songs, 1997
- Intimacy -- a Polemic, 1998
- Gap 6, 1999
- BAB-0, 2001
- A Garland of C-Sound, 2001
- GAP 8, 2002
- Shouldn't we Talk?, 2003
- Intermezzo in MIDI, 2003
- GAP 7, 2004
- Contrapunctus XI.2, 2004
- Boogiebop and Cartoon, 2004
- Notebook A, 2004
- A Benfest, 2004
- Ars Antiqua, 2005
- A Garland of MIDI, 2005
- Through Lapland, 2009
- Grow, 2010
- My Prayer for Bella, 2012
- The Way it Was, 2013

== Writings ==
- Haydn: String Quartet in D major, op. 76, no. 5, Music Review, 1960
- Pitch-Time Correlations, written 1962
- Godfrey Winham: Composition for Orchestra, Perspectives of New Music, 1963–64
- Convertible Counterpoint in the Strict Style (1906) by Serge Ivanovitch Tanaiev JMT, 1964
- Three Lectures to Scientists, Perspectives of New Music, 1967
- Compose Yourself -- A Manual for the Young, Perspectives of New Music, 1971 - 1974
- A Soundscroll, Perspectives of New Music, 1975
- How Music Goes, Perspectives of New Music, 1976
- ADVT. --> repeat after me, Perspectives of New Music, 1979–80
- Are You Serious?, Perspectives of New Music, 1985
- )something medieval), Lingua Press, 1988
- Ten Thoughts about Lyric Variations, 1993
- It's all Yours/ A Note on GAP 6, Open Space Magazine 3, 2001
- On Facing Front, Open Space Magazine 5, 2003
- What is it About ABOUT?, Open Space Magazine 5, 2003
- Being About Music, 2 vols. Collected writings of J.K. Randall and Ben Boretz, 2003
- Liner Notes to "Shouldn't we Talk?" , 2003
- When the Birds Come Calling (A Public Meditation on Two Recent Compositions by Ben Boretz), Open Space Magazine 8/9, Special Supplement, 2006 - 07.
- To Astonish the Roses, Open Space, 2013.

== J. K. Randall on video ==
- Interview with J. K. Randall (New York Public Library)
- JKR memorial on vimeo
- Milton Babbitt: Portrait of a Serial Composer (contains footage of J. K. Randall)
