= Jerome Kohl =

American musicologist (1946–2020)

- Born: Jerome Joseph Kohl; November 27, 1946
- Died: August 4, 2020 (aged 73); Seattle, Washington, U.S.
- Education: University of Nebraska–Lincoln; University of Washington
- Occupations: Music theorist; Journal editor; Music pedagogue
- Organizations: Seattle Recorder Society; Early Music Guild, Seattle; Perspectives of New Music; University of Washington
- Known for: Research on Karlheinz Stockhausen

Jerome Joseph Kohl (November 27, 1946 – August 4, 2020) was an American musicologist, academic journal editor, and recorder teacher. A music theorist at the University of Washington, he became recognized internationally as an authority on the music of Karlheinz Stockhausen.

== Life and work ==
Kohl grew up in Lincoln, Nebraska, with three siblings. During high school and college, he played the clarinet in the local symphony orchestra. He received his undergraduate, and in 1971, his master's degree in music from the University of Nebraska–Lincoln. Drafted into the army, he played in an army band during the Vietnam War. Afterward, he started his doctoral studies in music theory at the University of Washington in Seattle. In the 1970s, Kohl joined the Seattle Recorder Society, attending and running classes at its meetings, as well as teaching privately. In 1976, Kohl co-founded and became the board president of the Early Music Guild (EMG, now called Early Music Seattle) in Seattle, attracting international players to perform in the city. The EMG held a monthly concert by local players, and in 1980, Kohl played a concert with music from the 14th century to modern times. He continued to teach recorder for the Society for decades.

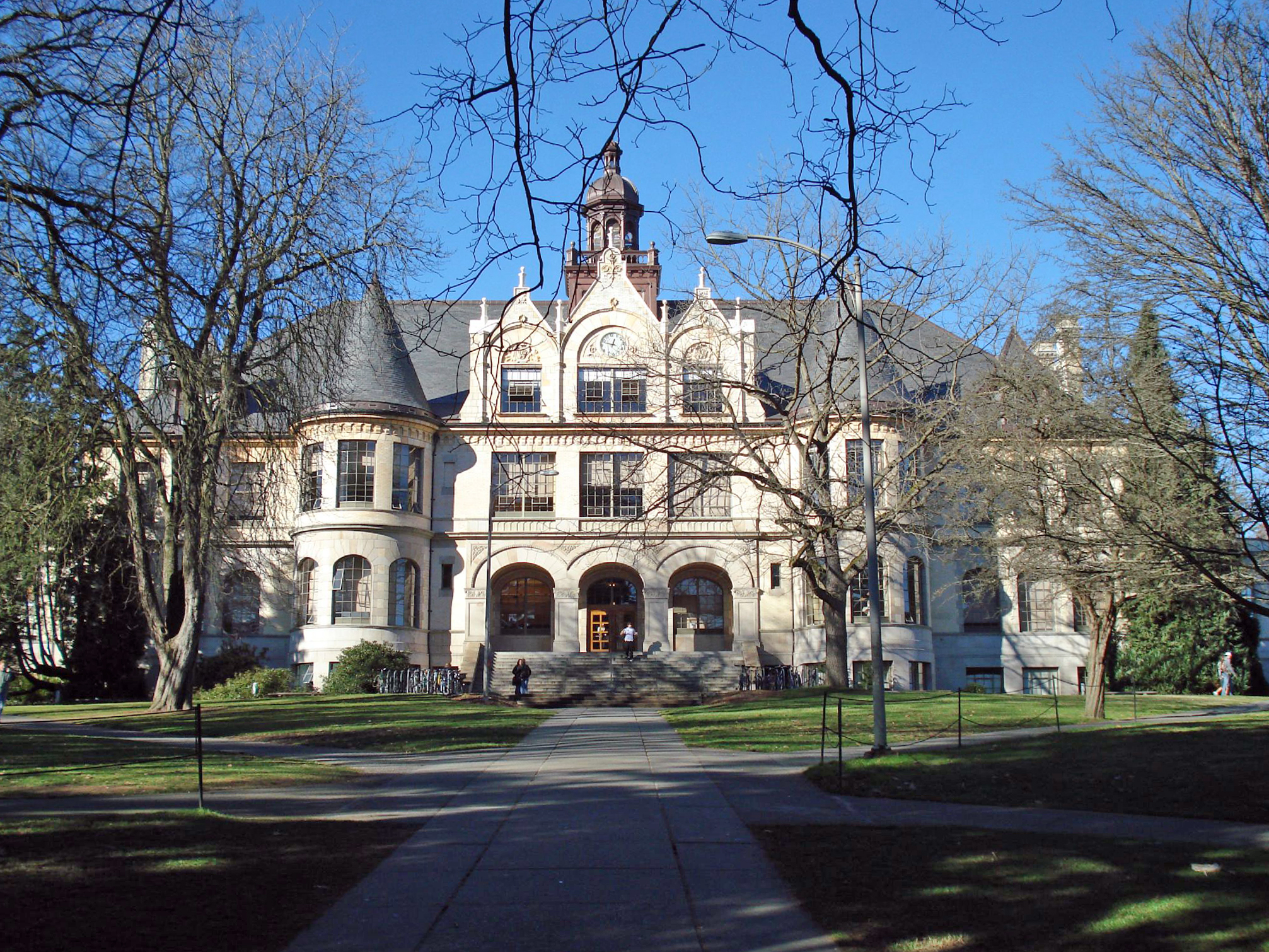
Denny Hall, home of the Classics Department at the University of Washington

Kohl concluded his studies in 1981 with his PhD thesis, "Serial and Non-Serial Techniques in the Music of Karlheinz Stockhausen from 1962–1968". He was managing editor of the journal Perspectives of New Music from 1985 to 1999. Between 2005 and 2018, he was Secretary of the Department of Classics at the University of Washington. In 2018, Kohl became Administrative Assistant at the university's Department of Political Science.

His research focus was contemporary classical music. He became recognized as a world expert on the works of Karlheinz Stockhausen, taking part in international conferences on his music. He collaborated with Stockhausen, traveling to Europe annually, and co-authored books with him. Kohl was also a contributor to Wikipedia, with more than 100,000 edits, creating many articles, especially about Stockhausen's work.

Kohl died in Seattle from a sudden heart attack, on August 4, 2020, at the age of 73. His death was commemorated by a memorial tribute in Perspectives of New Music, which called his 2017 book on Stockhausen's Zeitmaße "an astounding masterpiece".

== Publications ==
- Jerome Kohl (1979). "Exposition in Stravinsky's Orchestral Variations". Perspectives of New Music. 18 (1/2): 391–405. doi:10.2307/832991. ISSN 0031-6016. JSTOR 832991. Wikidata Q56069606.
- — (1981). Serial and Non-Serial Techniques in the Music of Karlheinz Stockhausen from 1962–1968 (PhD thesis). University of Washington. OCLC 15544439.
- — (Spring–Summer 1985). "Stockhausen on Opera". Perspectives of New Music. 23 (2): 24–39. doi:10.2307/832695. JSTOR 832695.
- Pascal Decroupet; Elena Ungeheuer; Jerome Kohl (1998). "Through the Sensory Looking-Glass: The Aesthetic and Serial Foundations of Gesang der Jünglinge". Perspectives of New Music. 36 (1): 97–142. doi:10.2307/833578. ISSN 0031-6016. JSTOR 833578. Wikidata Q56113062.
- Ivanka Stoianova; Jerome Kohl (1999). "And Dasein Becomes Music: Some Glimpses of Light". Perspectives of New Music. 37 (1): 179–212. doi:10.2307/833631. ISSN 0031-6016. JSTOR 833631. Wikidata Q57318353.
- — (1999). "Four Recent Books on Stockhausen". Perspectives of New Music. 37 (1): 213–245. doi:10.2307/833632. JSTOR 833632.
- — (2012). "A Gedenkschrift for Karlheinz Stockhausen". Perspectives of New Music. 50 (1–2): 306–312. doi:10.7757/persnewmusi.50.1-2.0306.
- — (2017). Karlheinz Stockhausen: Zeitmaße. New York: Routledge. ISBN 978-0-7546-5334-9.
