= Jonathan Cross (academic) =

British musicologist (b. 1961)

Jonathan Guy Evrill Cross
- Born: December 4, 1961 (age 64)
- Citizenship: United Kingdom
- Education: University of Bristol; University of Oxford; University of London
- Scientific career
- Workplaces: University of Bristol; University of Sussex; Christ Church, Oxford

Jonathan Guy Evrill Cross, FBA (born 4 December 1961), is a British musicologist who specialises in the 20th- and 21st-century music. He is an expert on the work of the British composer Harrison Birtwistle and the Russian composer Igor Stravinsky.

Cross graduated from the University of Bristol with a Bachelor of Arts in musicology and later graduated with a Magister of Arts from the University of Oxford and a PhD from the University of London. After he worked in the University of Sussex and the University of Bristol. He joined Christ Church, Oxford as in 2003, later being awarded a DLitt. He is also Professor of musicology at the University of Oxford.

Currently Cross is the editor of the journal Music Analysis, associate editor of Grove Music Online and a member of the Advisory Council of the Institute of Musical Research. His book The Stravinsky Legacy David H. Smyth called 'an ambitious undertaking'.

== Selected publications ==
- The Stravinsky Legacy. Music in the Twentieth Century. Vol. 8 (Illustrated ed.). Cambridge: Cambridge University Press. 1998. ISBN 978-0-521-56365-9.
- Harrison Birtwistle: Man, Mind, Music (Second ed.). London: Faber and Faber. 2014. ISBN 978-0-571-31780-6.
  - US edition: Harrison Birtwistle: Man, Mind, Music. Cornell Paperbacks. Ithaka, N. Y.: Cornell University Press. 2000. ISBN 978-0-801-48672-2.
- The Cambridge Companion to Stravinsky. Cambridge Companions to Music. Cambridge: Cambridge University Press. 2003. ISBN 978-0-521-66377-9. (editor)
- Harrison Birtwistle: The Mask of Orpheus (Second ed.). Milton Park, Oxfordshire: Routledge. 2017. ISBN 978-1-351-56412-0.
- Igor Stravinsky. Critical Lives. London: Reaktion Books. 2015. ISBN 978-1-780-23540-0.
