= Henry Lyman (poet) =

American poet

Henry Lyman is an American poet, editor, translator, and former host and producer of WFCR's Poems to a Listener, a nationally distributed series of readings and conversations with poets which ran from 1976 to 1994.

His poems and translations have appeared in periodicals, including The Nation, the New Directions annuals, The New York Times, and Poetry. A translator of the Estonian poet Aleksis Rannit, Lyman's translations have been published in two volumes, Cantus Firmus and Signum et Verbum. He edited a posthumously published collection of Robert Francis's poetry, and an anthology of twentieth-century New England poetry titled After Frost. Lyman also maintains Fort Juniper, the home of American poet Robert Francis, as a residence for writers, composers, and artists.
