= Society for Music Analysis =

UK academic society

The Society for Music Analysis is an academic society, founded in 1992 by Jonathan Dunsby, specializing in music theory and analysis. It is based in England and, although it does not produce it, is closely associated with the academic journal Music Analysis. which published its first issue in 1982.

The official website describes the SMA thus:

"The Society for Music Analysis (SMA) is a UK-based international organisation dedicated to music theory and analysis. We are affiliated with the journal Music Analysis and support and organise a regular programme of events, including the annual Theory and Analysis Graduate Students (TAGS) Conference, the Music Analysis Summer School (a residential course taught by international experts), and other Music Analysis Conferences (‘MACs’) and symposia. We are members of the European Theory & Analysis of Music (EuroT&AM) Network."

The formation and subsequent activities of the SMA gained sufficient attention so as to have been reported on in scholarly journals in mainland Europe as well as America. More regularly, numerous scholarly published articles refer to having initially being presented at SMA conferences or having published preliminary results in the SMA newsletter. Academic organizations in both Europe and America routinely include SMA in their listings. Besides its own annual conference, the SMA also holds study days and sponsors numerous other scholarly events as well as commissioning scholarly investigative projects. Additionally, the SMA issues various awards, such as the Pascall Medal, the Adele Katz Early Career Research Award, and so forth.

The mission of the SMA can be seen as fostering communication with respect to ongoing engagement with canonic repertoires as well as critical discourse surrounding and infusing this engagement. This has included sometimes tendentious debates waged, for instance at the 2014 SMA/EuroMAC conference in Leuven. More recently, for instance in its OxMAC conference in 2023, the SMA has focused on issues of musical literacy. The current president of SMA is Christopher Tarrant, who is Senior Lecturer in Music Analysis at Newcastle University.
