= Jonathan Dunsby =

Jonathan Mark Dunsby FRSA (born 16 March 1953) is a British classical pianist, musicologist, author and translator, particularly known for his research in musical analysis. His introductory textbook, Music Analysis in Theory and Practice (1988), co-authored with Arnold Whittall, is a standard work in the field. Dunsby has held professorships at the University of Reading (1985–2006) in the UK, and SUNY University at Buffalo (2006–7) and the Eastman School of Music, University of Rochester (from 2007) in the United States, and was the founding editor-in-chief of the journal Music Analysis (1982–86).

== Early life and education ==
Dunsby was born in Wakefield, West Riding of Yorkshire in 1953. He was educated at Bradford Grammar School, and was a pupil of the pianist Fanny Waterman for twelve years from 1964. He attended New College, University of Oxford, graduating with a BA in music (1973). His PhD was from the University of Leeds (1976), under the supervision of the composer Alexander Goehr, and was on the topic of musical analysis of Brahms; it was later published as the book, Structural Ambiguity in Brahms (1981).

== Performing career ==
In 1975, Dunsby won the Commonwealth Competition in piano, and he also had successes in the Leeds, Geneva and Munich piano competitions. He played in a duo with the violinist, Vanya Milanova, and has also performed with the singer Yvonne Minton and the cellist Felix Schmidt.

== Academic career ==
In 1976, Dunsby went to the United States, holding a Harkness Fellowship at Princeton University and the University of Southern California, returning in 1978 to the Bath College of Higher Education (now Bath Spa University). He was appointed lecturer at King's College, London (1979–85), under Arnold Whittall, and then became professor of music at the University of Reading (1985–2006); additionally he was an associate professor at the University of Southern California (1983) and a visiting fellow at New College, Oxford (1992). In 2006, he returned to the United States as the Slee Professor of Music Theory, SUNY University at Buffalo. The following year, he joined the Eastman School of Music of the University of Rochester, where, as of 2021, he is professor of music theory.

He was the first editor-in-chief of the journal Music Analysis (1982–86). In 1989, he was elected Fellow of the Royal Society of Arts. He is the inaugural chair and life president of the UK Society for Music Analysis (from 1992), and served as the president of the Music Theory Society of New York State (2009–13).

== Research ==
Dunsby researches in musical analysis, especially as it relates to performance, as well as the history of music from around 1800. After his doctoral thesis on Brahms, his early work focused on the analysis of Schoenberg. He published an introductory textbook on musical analysis, co-authored with Whittall (1988), described in Grove Music Online as "a standard work for students and teachers". In 1989, he published an opinion piece, "Performance and analysis of music", in Music Analysis, which Bethany Lowe credits as a thought-provoking early contribution to performance analysis.

His 1995 book Performing Music: Shared Concerns discusses performance studies as a discipline. In the book, Dunsby uses his dual background as both musician and academic to elucidate practical and mental aspects of performance. According to Sarah Martin, in a broadly positive review for Music Analysis, the book takes an unconventional approach to research into performance practice, by abandoning the analysis of historical performances based on documentary evidence or recordings. Instead Performing Music addresses two principal themes: musicians as problem-solvers interpreting the score, and the anxiety that Dunsby posits is inherent in performing, which he distinguishes from stage fright and which, in his opinion, forces players to turn to music theory – a recurrent topic throughout the book. He claims that in order to play a work, the performer must not only understand its structure, but also demonstrate this understanding in their performance in some fashion; otherwise, as he puts it, "the whole construction will crumble". Martin is not convinced on the latter point, describing it as an "extreme claim"; while she agrees that analysis can help to guide performance, she considers Dunsby's claim that such work is absolutely necessary to go too far. In a 1997 article in The Musical Times, he criticises the distinction between musical performance and the musical score, as developed in the work of Peter Kivy; a response from Peter Johnson comments on Dunsby's lack of discussion of musical performances.

He has also translated the works of Jean-Jacques Nattiez and Pierre Boulez.

== Selected publications ==
Authored books

- Jonathan Dunsby. Making Words Sing: Nineteenth-and Twentieth-Century Song (Cambridge University Press; 2004)
- Jonathan Dunsby. Performing Music: Shared Concerns (Oxford University Press; 1995, 1996)
- Jonathan Dunsby. Schoenberg: Pierrot Lunaire (Cambridge University Press; 1992)
- Jonathan Dunsby, Arnold Whittall. Music Analysis in Theory and Practice (Faber; 1988)
- Jonathan Dunsby. Structural Ambiguity in Brahms (UMI Research Press; 1981)

Edited books

- Jonathan Dunsby (ed). Early Twentieth-Century Music (Oxford University Press; 1993)

Articles and book chapters

- Jonathan Dunsby (1997). "Acts of Recall" The Musical Times, 138: 12–17 (JSTOR 1003412)
- Jonathan Dunsby (1989). "Guest editorial: Performance and analysis of music", Music Analysis, 8: 5–20
- Jonathan Dunsby. "The Multi-Piece in Brahms: Fantasien, op.116", in Brahms: Biographical, Documentary, and Analytical Studies, pp. 167–89 (R. Pascall, ed.) (Cambridge University Press; 1983)
