= Robert Morris (composer) =

American classical composer

- Born: Robert Daniel Morris; October 19, 1943 (age 82); Cheltenham, England

Academic background
- Education: University of Rochester (BM); University of Michigan (MM, DMA)

Academic work
- Discipline: Music
- Sub-discipline: Music theory Musical composition
- Institutions: University of Hawaiʻi at Mānoa; Yale University; Eastman School of Music; Bucknell University; University of Pittsburgh; University of the Arts

Robert Daniel Morris (born October 19, 1943) is a British-born American composer and music theorist.

== Early life and education ==
Born in Cheltenham, England, in 1943, Morris received his musical education at the Eastman School of Music (B.M. in composition with distinction) and the University of Michigan (M.M. and D.M.A. in composition and ethnomusicology), where he studied composition with John La Montaine, Leslie Bassett, Ross Lee Finney, and Eugene Kurtz.

== Career ==
As a Margret Lee Crofts Fellow, Morris worked with Gunther Schuller. Morris has taught composition, electronic music, and music theory at the University of Hawaiʻi at Mānoa and Yale University, where he was chairman of the Composition Department and director of the Yale Electronic Music Studio. He was also director of the Computer and Electronic Studio, director of graduate (music) Studies, and associate professor of Music at the University of Pittsburgh. In 1980 Morris joined the faculty of the Eastman School of Music, where he currently teaches as professor of composition. Other teaching posts have included positions at the University of the Arts, the Pennsylvania Governor's School for the Arts, the University of Pittsburgh Computer Music Workshop, and the Berkshire Music Center at Tanglewood.

== Written works ==
=== Musical compositions ===
Morris has written music for a wide variety of musical forms and media. He has composed over 200 works including computer and improvisational music. Much of his output from the 1970s is influenced by non-Western music and uses structural principles from Arabic, Indian, Indonesian, Japanese, and early Western musics. While such influences are less noticeable in his more recent works, the temporal and ornamental qualities of Eastern music have permanently affected Morris's style. Moreover, Morris has found much resonance among his musical aesthetics, his experiences in hiking (especially in the Southwestern United States), his study and appreciation of Carnatic Music of South India, and his reading of ancient Indian, Chinese, and Japanese Buddhist texts. Among his present compositional projects is a series of the works to be played outdoors in a natural setting. Seven of these works are complete and have been performed: Playing Outside (2000), Coming Down to Earth (2002), Oracle (2005), Sound/Path/Field (2006), Arboretum (2009), Sun, Moon, Earth (2012) and Four Gardens (2014). A new work for wind ensemble outdoors was premiered on Sunday September 18, 2022 by the Eastman Wind Ensemble at Durand Eastman Park in Rochester, New York. This new composition is entitled Sounds, Trees, Meadows and was premiered as a part of the Centennial celebration of the Eastman School of Music.

=== Books ===
In addition to his music, Morris has written three books and over 50 articles and reviews which have appeared in the Journal of Music Theory, In Theory Only, Music Theory Spectrum, Journal of the American Musicology Society, and Perspectives of New Music, contributing to theories of musical analysis and aesthetics, compositional design, and electronic and computer music. Morris was the recipient of the "Outstanding Publication Award" of the Society for Music Theory in 1988 for his book, Composition with Pitch-Classes: A Theory of Compositional Design, published by Yale University Press, and in 2001 for his article "Voice Leading Spaces" in Music Theory Spectrum 20/2. Advanced Class Notes for Atonal Theory, is available from Frog Peak Music. Morris is currently co-editor of Perspectives of New Music and contributing editor of The Open Space Magazine. His most recent book is The Whistling Blackbird: Essays and Talks on New Music (2010).
