= Music Analysis (journal) =

- Discipline: Music theory
- Language: English
- Edited by: Alan Street

Publication details
- History: 1982–present
- Publisher: Wiley-Blackwell
- Frequency: Triannually

Standard abbreviations
- ISO 4: Music Anal.

Indexing
- ISSN: 0262-5245 (print); 1468-2249 (web)
- LCCN: 83641578
- JSTOR: 02625245
- OCLC no.: 299336042

Links
- Journal homepage

Music Analysis is a peer-reviewed academic journal specializing in music theory and analysis. It is based in England and published its first issue in 1982. Although the journal "is not produced on behalf of a society, it is closely associated with the Society for Music Analysis."

Its website describes Music Analysis as an "international forum for the presentation of new writing focused on musical works and repertoires." It "is eclectic in its coverage of music from medieval to post-modern times, and has regular articles on non-western music. Its lively tone and focus on specific works makes it of interest to the general reader as well as the specialist." The journal has also featured translations of articles by Theodor W. Adorno and Heinrich Schenker.

The journal's first editor-in-chief was Jonathan Dunsby. It is currently edited by Edward Venn (editor-in-chief), Anne Hyland (associate editor) and Chris Stover (critical forum). Previous editors include Anthony Pople, William Drabkin, Alan Street, and Michael Spitzer.
