= Perspectives of New Music =

- Discipline: Music theory and musical analysis
- Language: English
- Edited by: Clifton Callendar, Chris Stover

Publication details
- History: 1962–present
- Publisher: Perspectives of New Music, Seattle (US)
- Frequency: Biannual

Standard abbreviations
- ISO 4: Perspect. New Music

Indexing
- ISSN: 0031-6016
- LCCN: 66089176
- JSTOR: 00316016
- OCLC no.: 805415023

Links
- Journal homepage

Perspectives of New Music (PNM) is a peer-reviewed academic journal specializing in music theory and analysis. It was established in 1962 by Arthur Berger and Benjamin Boretz (who were its initial editors-in-chief).

Perspectives was first published by the Princeton University Press, initially supported by the Fromm Music Foundation. The first issue was favorably reviewed in the Journal of Music Theory, which observed that Berger and Boretz had produced "a first issue which sustains such a high quality of interest and cogency among its articles that one suspects the long delay preceding the yet-unborn Spring 1963 issue may reflect a scarcity of material up to their standard".

However, as the journal's editorial "perspective" coalesced, Fromm became—in the words of David Gable—disenchanted with the "exclusive viewpoint [that] came to dominate" it. "However intrinsically valuable the kinds of analytic approaches that came to typify it may [have been], Perspectives [became] in essence a highly specialized theory journal for contemporary music. For a decade, Fromm and certain members of the advisory board attempted to broaden the journal's scope, and when the editorial board ... refused to return to the original conception, Fromm withdrew his funding in 1972.

When Fromm discontinued his support, Perspectives of New Music formed an independent corporation, which has continued its publication.

Boretz edited the journal from 1962 through 1983, with co-editors Berger (1962–1964), Edward T. Cone (1968–1972), and Elaine Barkin (1972–1983). John Rahn was editor from 1983 until 1993, and Boretz again in 1994/95. From 1995 until 2000, there was a group of five editors: Joseph Dubiel, Marion Guck, Marianne Kielian-Gilbert, Andrew Mead, and Stephen Peles. Musicologist Jerome Kohl was the journal's managing editor from 1985 to 1999. After another term by Boretz and Rahn with Robert Morris, the current editors are Clifton Callendar and Chris Stover.
