= Gruppen =

Music composition by Karlheinz Stockhausen

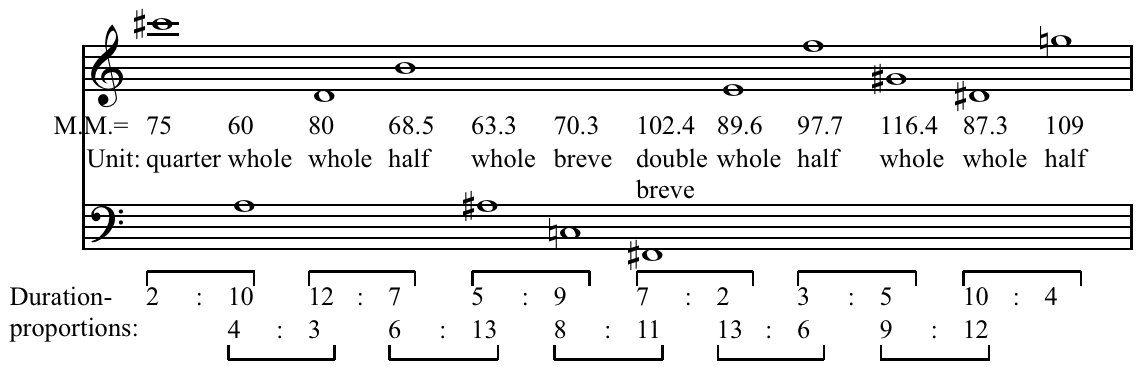
Example 12 from Stockhausen's article "... wie die Zeit vergeht ...", illustrating with a version of the series from Gruppen für drei Orchester that, "if you start from the intervals of a proportion series, then with every step forward the register of each duration is also already chosen". There are "a number of basic durations, indicated in metronome marks and corresponding with the pitch proportions within the series, reaching far as the octave positions (basic duration units)", or "a duration scale which changes its 'time register' ... corresponds to a twelve-tone scale that extends over more than one octave".

Gruppen (German for "Groups") for three orchestras (1955–57) is amongst the best-known compositions of German composer Karlheinz Stockhausen, and is Work Number 6 in the composer's catalog of works. Gruppen is "a landmark in 20th-century music ... probably the first work of the post-war generation of composers in which technique and imagination combine on the highest level to produce an undisputable masterpiece".

== History ==
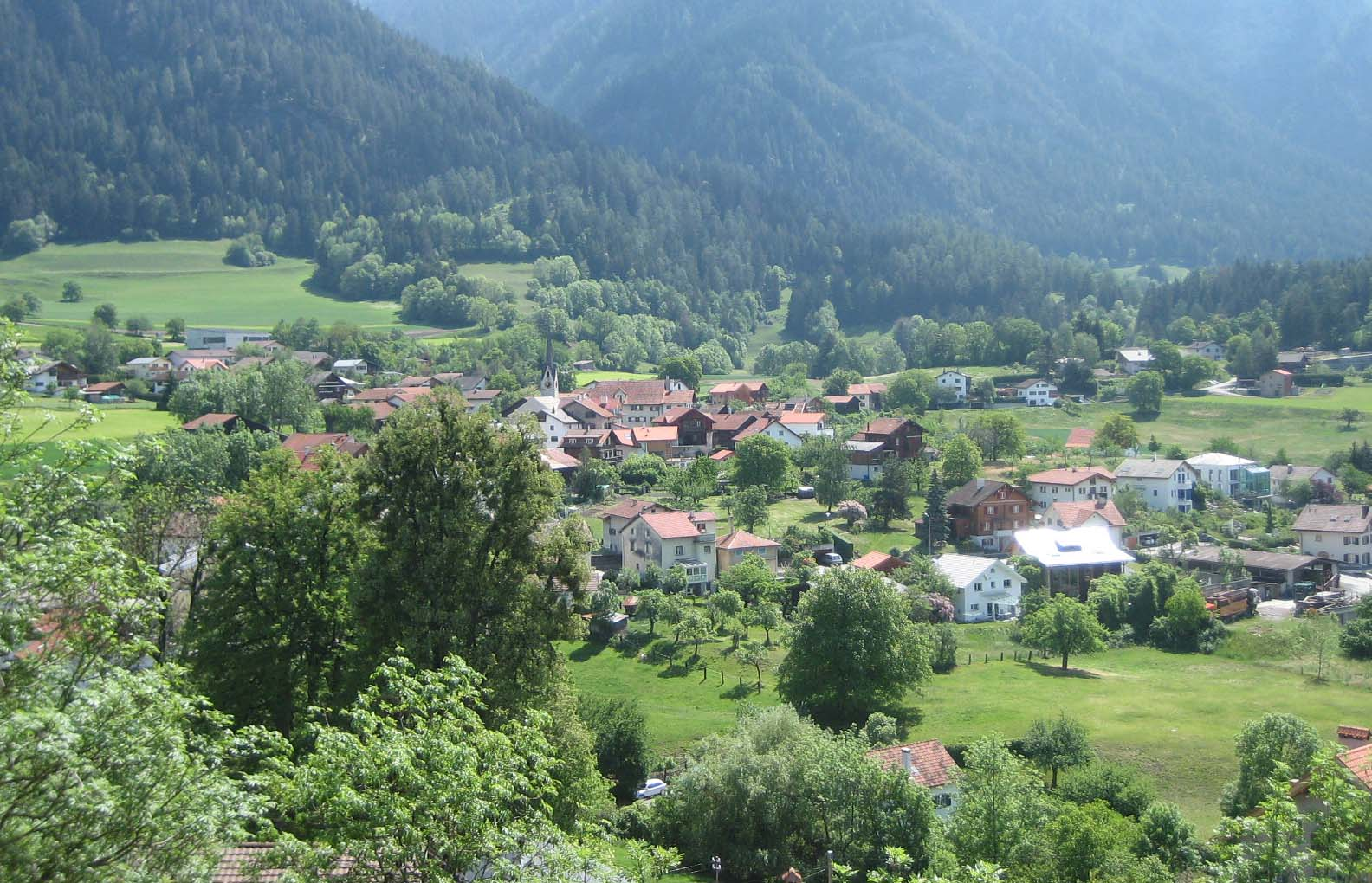
Paspels, the village where Stockhausen began work on Gruppen

Early in 1955 Stockhausen received a commission from WDR for a new orchestral composition, but his ongoing work on Gesang der Jünglinge prevented him from starting right away. In August and September, he took the opportunity to retreat to an inexpensive rented room in the attic of a parsonage in Paspels, Switzerland, recommended to him by a colleague, Paul Gredinger. Surrounded by the splendour of the Graubünden alps, he created the entire plan of Gruppen, "with a completely new conception of musical time". The surroundings provided more than just a conducive environment for work.

in Gruppen ... whole envelopes of rhythmic blocks are exact lines of mountains that I saw in Paspels in Switzerland right in front of my little window. Many of the time spectra, which are represented by superimpositions of different rhythmic layers—of different speeds in each layer—their envelope which describes the increase and decrease of the number of layers, their shape, so to speak, the shape of the time field, are the curves of the mountain's contour which I saw when I looked out the window.

Originally the work was to have been for multi-channel electronic music with large orchestra, with metrically indeterminate parts for the orchestra. Once having decided to divide the orchestra into three parts, each with its own conductor, Stockhausen gave up the electronic sounds and incorporated some of what had previously been thought of as electronic music into the orchestra. The indeterminate tempos also proved impractical, and were dropped after a few experimental pages of score had been written out.

Upon returning to Cologne, Stockhausen resumed work on Gesang der Jünglinge and then composed the wind quintet Zeitmaße and Klavierstück XI, before turning to working-out the details of Gruppen, which occupied him for all of 1957. The premiere of the work took place in the Rheinsaal of the Kölner Messe in Cologne-Deutz, as part of the WDR's concert series Musik der Zeit, on 24 March 1958 with the Cologne Radio Symphony Orchestra, conducted by Stockhausen (orchestra I), Bruno Maderna (orchestra II), and Pierre Boulez (orchestra III). The score is dedicated to Herbert Eimert, director at that time of the WDR electronic music studio. Gruppen was performed twice on the programme, with the world premiere of Pierre Boulez's Third Piano Sonata, performed by the composer, in between.

== Material and form ==
A large orchestra of 109 players is divided into three orchestral units, each with its own conductor, which are deployed in a horseshoe shape to the left, front, and right of the audience. The spatial separation was principally motivated by the compositional requirement of keeping simultaneously played yet musically separate passages distinct from one another, but led to some orgiastic passages in which a single musical process passes from one orchestra to another.

The title refers to the work's construction in 174 units, mainly composed in what Stockhausen terms "groups"—cohesive groupings of notes unified through one or more common characteristics (dynamics, instrumental color, register, etc.): "a particular number of notes which are joined, by means of related proportions, into a superordinate experiential quality (namely, the group). The various groups in a composition have various proportional features—various structures—but they are interrelated in that the properties of one group may only be understood by comparing them in degree of relationship with the other groups". This category is contrasted with the "punctual" style of early Darmstadt serialism, which nevertheless also occurs in Gruppen, along with a third category of "collective" or "statistical" swarms or crowds, too dense for the listener to be able to accurately distinguish individual notes or their order of succession. Consequently, the importance of individual notes is relatively low, so that sonority, density, speed, dynamics, and direction of movement become the main features for the listener.

Nonetheless, a traditional twelve-tone row is used as its basis:

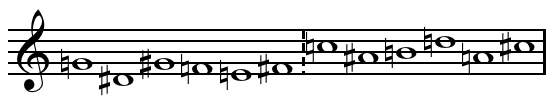
Gruppen tone row (Note: Harvey, Misch, Whittall, Stockhausen and Maconie show this row transposed up a tritone). See tone row for Klavierstück IX.)

This is a symmetrical all-interval row, in which the first half consists of the intervals of a descending major third, rising perfect fourth, descending minor third, descending minor second, and ascending major second. The second half consists of the retrograde of the first half, transposed by a tritone. In other words, the row is "degenerate", in that the second hexachord is a retrograde of the first, transposed by six semitones. However, Stockhausen does not exploit the specific twelve-tone compositional applications of such a row, which suggests that either Stockhausen was not interested in or did not know about them. Because of the chord transformations that emerge between rehearsal numbers 118 and 120 it appears that Stockhausen was in fact aware of these properties, making it most likely that the relationship simply did not interest him compositionally.

Many of the conceptual bases of the work are explained in Stockhausen's famous article, "... How Time Passes ...". In this essay, Stockhausen developed a serial organizational principle at the center of which stood the concept of a twelve-step duration series possessing the same structural properties as the basic twelve-tone pitch series. This became the basis for the entire process of serial organization of Gruppen. This duration series, however, is expressed not as single units (which would correspond to single vibrations of a pitch) but rather as metronomic tempos in sufficiently long stretches of time to enable conductors and musicians to change tempo with precision. However, because the resulting "fundamental durations" are not small enough for use in the musical detail, subdivisions corresponding to the transposition of the overtones of a pitch's harmonic spectrum are used.

The twelve logarithmic metronomic tempos used in Gruppen, covering a tempo "octave" (doubling in speed) from = 60 to 120 are 60, 63.5, 67, 71, 75.5, 80, 85, 90, 95, 101, 107, 113.5, and 120. The composer recalled that, when Igor Stravinsky saw the score for the first time, he wrote that such fractional metronomic values as 63.5 and 113.5 were "a sign of German thoroughness".

== Instrumentation ==
=== Orchestra I ===
Woodwinds

1 flute (doubling piccolo)
1 alto flute
1 oboe
1 English horn
1 clarinet
1 bassoon

Brass

2 horns (high and low)
2 trumpets
2 trombones (2nd with bass valve)
1 bass tuba

Percussion (4 percussionists)

1 marimbaphone (5 octaves) or 4-octave marimbaphone plus xylophone for highest octave
1 glockenspiel
5 cowbells [Almglocken] (suspended, without clappers): pitches 1, 4, 7, 10, 13
4 metal instruments, pitches 1, 4, 7, 10:

1 tamtam (large)
3 cymbals (large, medium, small)

2 wood drums (African slotted drums, each with 2 pitches): pitches 1, 7 / 4, 10
4 drums: tomtoms and/or tumbas and bongos (in the high register): pitches 1, 4, 7, 10
1 snare drum (shallow jazz drum, very bright sound)
1 tambourine (with either small bells or jingles)

Keyboards

1 keyboard glockenspiel (or celesta)

Strings

1 harp

10 violins
2 violas
4 cellos
2 double basses

=== Orchestra II ===
Woodwinds

2 flutes (1st doubling piccolo)
1 oboe
1 piccolo clarinet
1 alto saxophone (doubling clarinet)
1 baritone saxophone
1 bassoon

Brass

3 horns (1st and 3rd higher, 2nd lower)
2 trumpets
1 trombone
1 bass trombone

Percussion (4 percussionists)

1 vibraphone
14 tubular bells
4 cowbells [Almglocken] (suspended, without clappers): pitches 2, 5, 8, 11
4 metal instruments, pitches 2, 5, 8, 11:

1 tamtam (medium)
3 cymbals (large, medium, small)

2 wood drums (African slotted drums, each with 2 pitches): pitches 2, 8 / 5, 11
4 drums: tomtoms and/or tumbas and bongos (in the high register)
1 snare drum (shallow jazz drum, very bright sound)
1 tambourine (with either small bells or jingles)
1 ratchet
2 triangles (1 higher, 1 lower)

Keyboards

1 [grand] piano (without cover)

Strings

1 electric guitar

8 violins
4 violas
2 cellos
2 double basses

=== Orchestra III ===
Woodwinds

1 flute (doubling piccolo)
1 oboe
1 English horn
1 clarinet
1 bass clarinet
1 bassoon

Brass

3 horns (1st and 3rd higher, 2nd lower)
2 trumpets
2 trombones (both with bass valve)
1 contrabass trombone (or tuba)

Percussion (4 percussionists)

1 xylorimba (4 octaves) [according to the list of instruments in the preface; in the score itself, a marimbaphone is specified]
4 cowbells [Almglocken] (suspended, without clappers): pitches 3, 6, 9, 12
4 metal instruments, pitches 3, 6, 9, 12:

1 tamtam (small)
3 cymbals (large, medium, small)

2 wood drums (African slotted drums, each with 2 pitches): pitches 3, 9 / 6, 12
4 drums: tomtoms and/or tumbas and bongos (in the high register)
1 snare drum (shallow jazz drum, very bright sound)
1 tambourine (with small bells or jingles)

Keyboards

1 celesta (5 octaves)

Strings

1 harp

8 violins
4 violas
2 cellos
2 double basses

== Discography ==
In chronological order of first issue.

- 1968. WDR Symphony Orchestra, Cologne, conducted by Karlheinz Stockhausen, Bruno Maderna, and Michael Gielen. Recorded May 1965; released with Stockhausen's Carré on Deutsche Grammophon DG 137 002 (LP), DG921022 (Cassette). [N.p.]: Polydor International.
  - reissued under the same LP disc number, in the first set of Deutsche Grammophon's Avant Garde series. [Hamburg]: Deutsche Grammophon Gesellschaft, 1968.
  - reissued on reel-to-reel 7-1/2 ips tape, as DGC 7002. Elk Grove Village, Illinois: Ampex/Deutsche Grammophon, ca. 1974.
  - reissued on Stockhausen Complete Edition CD 5. Kürten: Stockhausen-Verlag, 1992.
  - reissued (without Carré) on Die Neue Musik und ihre neuesten Entwicklungen, Opus Musicum OM 116 – OM 118 [6833 174–76] (3-LP set), (with works by Berio, Boulez, Earle Brown, Cage, Luc Ferrari, Henze, Kagel, Ligeti, Messiaen, Jens-Peter Ostendorf, Penderecki, Schnebel, Xenakis, Zimmermann). Cologne: Arno Volk Verlag; Hans Gerig KG, 1975.
- 1982. Deutscher Musikrat: Zeitgenössische Musik in der Bundesrepublik Deutschland 4: 1950–1960. WDR Symphony Orchestra, Cologne, cond. Karlheinz Stockhausen (orchestra 1), Bruno Maderna (orchestra 2), Pierre Boulez (orchestra 3). Recorded 24 March 1958 in four channels; stereo mix 1982. Deutsche Harmonia Mundi DMR 1010–12 (3-LP boxed set). Cologne: EMI Electrola.
- 1996. Berliner Philharmoniker, cond. Friedrich Goldmann (orchestra 1), Claudio Abbado (orchestra 2), Marcus Creed (orchestra 3). Recorded Berlin, Philharmonie, Grosser Saal, December 1994. (with Kurtág, Grabstein für Stephan, op. 15c, and Stele, op. 33). DG 447 761-2; also issued on DG 940 462-2. Reissued in 2012 on Deutsche Grammophon 001708102.
- 2005. Leaving Home: Orchestral Music in the 20th Century. A Conducted Tour by Sir Simon Rattle. Volume 6: "After the Wake". City of Birmingham Symphony Orchestra, conducted by Simon Rattle, John Carewe, and Daniel Harding. Recorded Symphony Hall, Birmingham, 2 March 1996. Complete performance of Gruppen as a DVD extra. (Programme includes excerpts from: Boulez, Le Marteau sans maître; Britten, Serenade for Tenor, Horn and Strings, Op. 31; Schoenberg, A Survivor from Warsaw, Op. 46; Stockhausen, Gruppen; Richard Strauss, Four Last Songs; Stravinsky, Agon). Arthaus Musik, DVD 102 043. Also available as part of a 7-DVD set, Arthaus Musik 102 073. Leipzig: Arthaus Musik.
- 2006a. Schönberg Ensemble Edition: A Century of Music in Perspective. Schönberg Ensemble, Asko Ensemble, Amsterdam Sinfonietta, Nederlands Blazers Ensemble, Nieuw Ensemble, Slagwerkgroep Den Haag, cond. Reinbert de Leeuw, Oliver Knussen, Robert Spano. Recorded 3 September 1995. Released on SACD as disc 9 in the 27-disc CD/DVD set, Etcetera KTC9000 (22 CDs 1 SACD 4 DVDs). Also issued separately, as Schönberg Ensemble Edition nr. 9.
- 2006b. Eötvös Conducts Stockhausen: Gruppen, Punkte. WDR Symphony Orchestra, Cologne, conducted by Arturo Tamayo (orchestra 1), Péter Eötvös (orchestra 2), Jacques Mercier (orchestra 3). Recorded by WDR at Messe Rheinlandsaal, Cologne 28 May/2 June 1997. (with Stockhausen: Punkte). BMC CD 117. [Budapest]: Budapest Music Center Records.
- 2012. Tanglewood 75: Anniversary Celebration: From the Audio Archives 1937–2012. Tanglewood Music Center Orchestra, cond. Oliver Knussen, Reinbert de Leeuw, Robert Spano. Recorded 25 August 1993, Theatre-Concert Hall, Tanglewood, Mass. MP3 or FLAC download (stereo). BSO Classics TWD75 31 0720 01. [Boston]: Boston Symphony Orchestra.
