= Composition for Twelve Instruments =

1948 music composition by Milton Babbitt

Composition for Twelve Instruments (1948, rev. 1954) is a serial music composition written by American composer Milton Babbitt for flute, oboe, clarinet, bassoon, horn, trumpet, harp, celesta, violin, viola, cello, and double bass. In it Babbitt for the first time employs a twelve-element duration set to serialize the rhythms as well as the pitches, predating Olivier Messiaen's (non-serial) "Mode de valeurs et d'intensités", but not the Turangalîla-Symphonie (1946–1948), in which Messiaen used a duration series for the first time in the opening episode of the seventh movement, titled "Turangalîla II". (Babbitt had also earlier used a different kind of rhythmic series, and serial manipulation thereof, in his Three Compositions for Piano (1947) and Composition for Four Instruments (1948).)

Babbitt's use of rhythm in Composition for Twelve Instruments was criticized by Peter Westergaard in Perspectives of New Music: "can we be expected to hear a family resemblance between a dotted half note followed by a sixteenth note (the opening 'interval' of duration set P_{0}) and an eighth note followed by a dotted eighth note (the opening 'interval' of duration set P_{2})?" He would later employ an approach based on time points, which Westergaard described as a solution to the above problems.

The combinatorial tone row used may be represented: 0 1 4 9 5 8 3 t 2 e 6 7

== Discography ==
- Slowly Expanding Milton Babbitt Album: Composition for Twelve Instruments (1948, rev. 1954). Julietta Curenton (flute); James Austin Smith (oboe); Joshua Rubin (clarinet); Rebekah Heller (bassoon); David Byrd-Marrow (horn); Peter Evans (trumpet); Nuiko Wadden (harp); Steve Beck (celesta); Erik Carlson (violin); Chris Otto (viola); Chris Gross (cello); Randy Zigler (bass), produced by Erik Carlson, 2013.
