= Zeitmaße =

Wind quintet by Karlheinz Stockhausen

- Wind quintet by Karlheinz Stockhausen
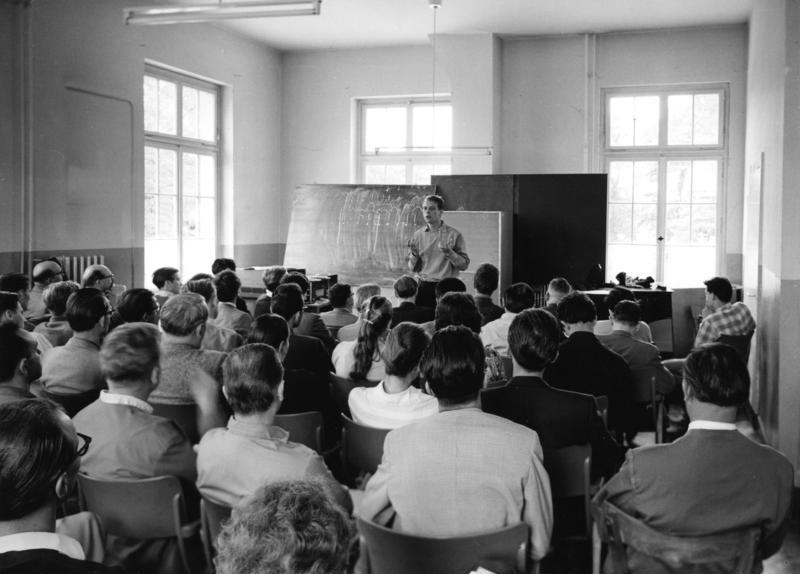
- Stockhausen lecturing at the Darmstädter Ferienkurse, July 1957
- Catalogue: 5
- Composed: 1955–56
- Performed: 15 December 1956
- Scoring: flute; oboe; cor anglais; clarinet; bassoon

Zeitmaße (German pronunciation: [ˈtsaɪtmasə]; German for "Time Measures") is a chamber-music work for five woodwinds (flute, oboe, cor anglais, clarinet, and bassoon) composed in 1955–1956 by German composer Karlheinz Stockhausen; it is Number 5 in the composer's catalog. It is the first of three wind quintets written by Stockhausen, followed by Adieu für Wolfgang Sebastian Meyer (1966) and the Rotary Wind Quintet (1997), but is scored with cor anglais instead of the usual French horn of the standard quintet. Its title refers to the different ways that musical time is treated in the composition.

== History ==
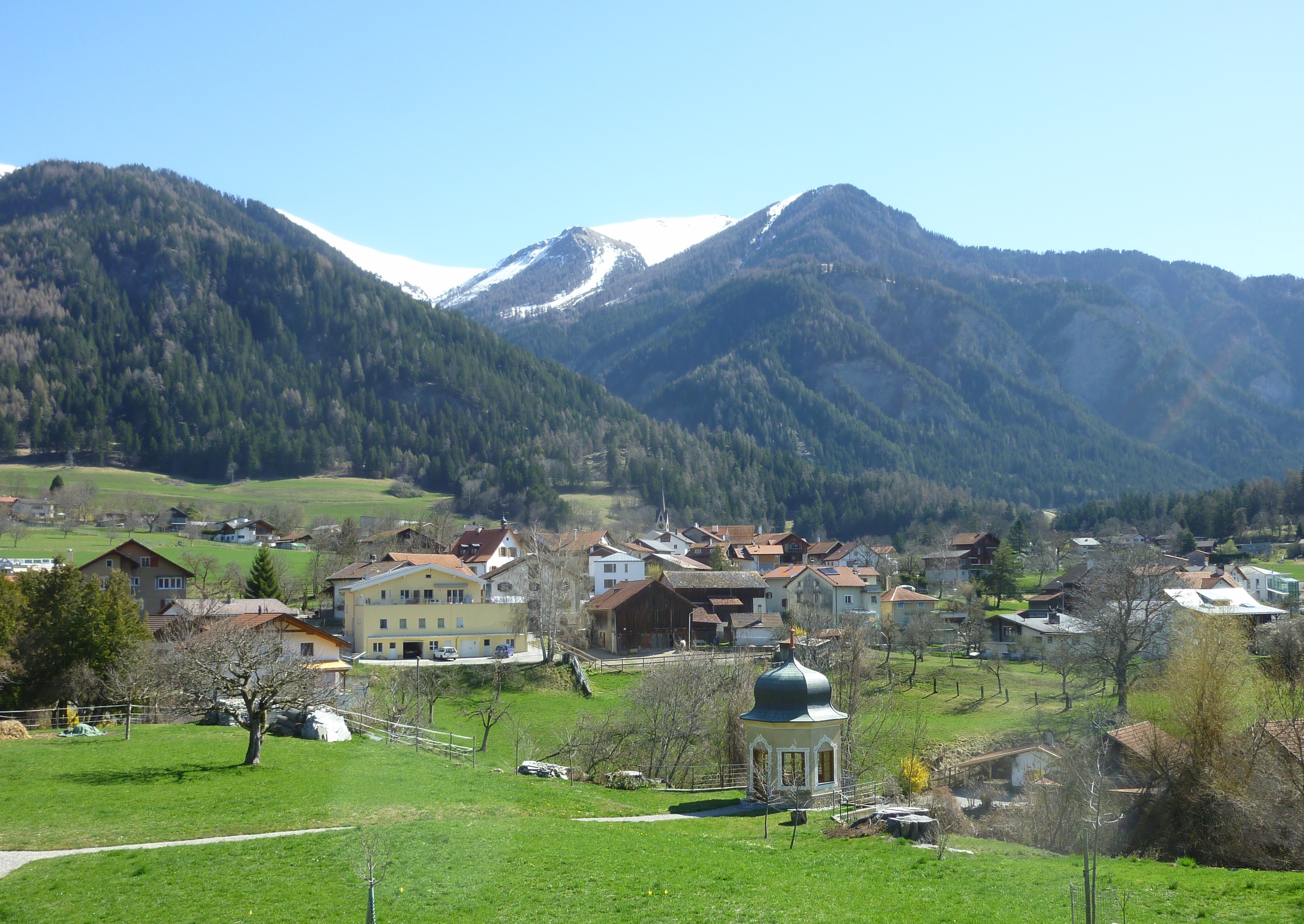
Paspels, the village where Stockhausen began work on Zeitmaße.

Zeitmaße was composed more or less concurrently with three other works in contrasting media, which together formed the basis for Stockhausen's rise to fame in the 1950s. The others were Gesang der Jünglinge for electronic and concrète sounds, Gruppen for three orchestras, and Klavierstück XI for piano.

In order to begin work on a commission for the new orchestral composition which would become Gruppen, Stockhausen interrupted work on Gesang der Jünglinge in August 1955, retreating to an inexpensive rented room in the attic of a parsonage in Paspels, Switzerland, recommended to him by a colleague in the WDR studio, Paul Gredinger. He had scarcely arrived in Paspels when a message reached him, requesting a short composition to celebrate Heinrich Strobel's tenth anniversary of service at the Südwestrundfunk, Baden-Baden.

I had to write something quickly, by that evening. I did not allow myself to take any time over it. And then, suddenly, I hear this whole little four-minute piece. I really chuckled to myself about it. It was for voice and wind quintet [sic]. Later I replaced the vocal part with a cor anglais, and the "piece" is the first four minutes of Zeitmaße.

The humorous, caprice-like song—for alto voice, flute, clarinet in A, and bassoon—sets an epigrammatic text written by Strobel, in a French translation by Antoine Goléa.:

On cherche pour trouver quelque chose. Mais au fond, on ne sait pas ce qu'on cherche au juste. Et cela est vrai non seulement pour l'Allemagne musicale.

(We are seeking to find something. But at bottom, we do not know quite what we are looking for. And that is true not only of German musical life.)

The song, in which Stockhausen omits the last five words of the French text, was later published in a memorial volume for Strobel. Upon returning to Cologne, Stockhausen resumed work on Gesang der Jünglinge and returned also to Zeitmaße—now scored for flute, oboe, cor anglais, clarinet, and bassoon—completing a first version that was recorded for the radio in December 1955 by the Wind Quintet of the WDR Symphony Orchestra (led by their oboist, Wilhelm Meyer), and first broadcast in January 1956. Stockhausen subsequently nearly doubled the length of the work by inserting five "cadenzas", which became the defining moments of the composition. The planned premiere by the WDR Quintet at the Darmstädter Ferienkurse in July 1956 fell through, but Stockhausen brought the score there anyway and showed it to his friends. Pierre Boulez initially dismissed Zeitmaße with a characteristically cutting remark to the effect that Stockhausen would do better to stay in the electronic studio, but soon changed his mind and asked to programme it in Paris in his Domaine Musical concert series. Stockhausen agreed, and the world premiere took place there on 15 December 1956, "before a quiet and extremely attentive audience". Five months later, Boulez included Zeitmaße in a programme taken on tour to London—a performance which was broadcast by the BBC on 6 May 1957—and after returning to Paris, made the first recording for commercial release. This recording was made in the composer's presence over a span of eight days in June 1957.

In the meantime, the WDR Quintet had made a recording for broadcast, and in February 1957 gave the German premiere in Bonn, followed in March by a tour to Baden-Baden, Linz, Vienna, and Venice, performing the piece twice on each programme. In a letter to Wolfgang Steinecke, director of the Darmstadt Courses, Stockhausen reported a "quite unexpectedly huge, genuine success" on every occasion, and that he was "especially surprised by the spontaneous reaction of the Italians". Steinecke had already invited Stockhausen to give seminars at Darmstadt. One was titled "Time Composition" and focused on Zeitmaße and Klavierstück XI; Universal Edition had promised delivery of the printed score in time for the performance of Zeitmaße on 22 July. The other was on that year's announced topic, "Music and Speech", and discussed Boulez's Le Marteau sans maître and Nono's Il canto sospeso, as well as Stockhausen's own Gesang der Jünglinge.

== Material and form ==
Many of the conceptual bases of the work are explained in Stockhausen's article, "... How Time Passes ...", written in September and October 1956 while work on both Zeitmaße and Gruppen was in progress. In this essay, Stockhausen developed a serial organizational principle centered on the concept of a twelve-step duration series possessing the same structural properties as the basic twelve-note pitch series. This became the basis for the entire process of serial organization of Gruppen, but also formed the basis for the concluding part of Zeitmaße. This duration series, however, is expressed not as single units—which would correspond to single vibrations of a pitch—but rather as metronomic tempos in sufficiently long stretches of time to enable musicians to change tempo with precision. However, because the resulting "fundamental durations" are not small enough for use in the musical detail, subdivisions corresponding to the transposition of the overtones of a pitch's harmonic spectrum are used. The German title Zeitmaße can be translated as "tempos", but in this piece, the title has a broader meaning. There are five general categories of "time measures", which are found both separately and in various combinations:

1. Metronomically measured tempos, in twelve different degrees, measured as a chromatic scale
2. "As fast as possible", dependent on the abilities of the player and the nature of the musical passage
3. "As slowly as possible", with the passage to be performed in one breath
4. Fast, slowing down to about a quarter the initial speed
5. Slow, speeding up to "as fast as possible"

An important aspect of the piece is an absence of thinking in terms of separate voices. Instead, there are note complexes (or "chords") which may be shaped in several ways. The notes may be struck together and then drop out one by one, or do the opposite by entering one at a time and building up into a dense structure. During a sustained chord, the internal dynamics may change as different instruments enter or fade away. Individual lines tend to disappear in favour of changing statistical densities, and transitions between the linear and the simultaneous are always present.

Although it is a serial composition, this matters most on the levels of rhythm, polyphony (control of density), and articulation. Serial pitch (dodecaphonic) procedures are not terribly important from the listener's perspective. The decisive thing is a very homogeneous and rigorous harmonic texture conforming to the principles of Webernism. Put another way, what matters most is gesture, which is the product of contour, intensity, and note density. However, in both the melodic and harmonic realms, and especially in slow passages, Stockhausen strongly favours the succession of a semitone and a major or minor third.

The placement of the instruments on the platform as prescribed in the original version of the score is slightly unconventional (from left to right: oboe, flute, cor anglais, clarinet, bassoon), and is intended to evenly distribute the edgy timbres of the three double-reed instruments across the stage, and balance them with the purer flute and smoother clarinet timbres. This stage placement is reflected in the ordering of the parts in the score. In the revised edition, printed in 1997 and 2004, the order of the instruments on the platform is reversed to read: bassoon, clarinet, cor anglais, flute, oboe.

The original version of Zeitmaße (before insertion of the "cadenzas") was in three sections: a quartet (for flute, cor anglais, clarinet, and bassoon), a trio (for flute, oboe, and clarinet), and a quintet for the full ensemble. This 4:3:5 proportioning is representative of a serial approach that operates throughout the work in many different ways.

The first section (bars 1–29) corresponds to the original song. Durations are governed here by sets of five values, arrayed in a basic square:

Zeitmaße (duration square, b. 1–29)
3	5	4	1	2
5	2	1	3	4
4	1	5	2	3
1	3	2	4	5
2	4	3	5	1

The first series uses the quaver as counting unit, the next uses semiquavers, and so on. The pitches begin with a twelve-note row—C♯ D A C G♯ E D♯ F♯ F B A♯ G—which generates further series, where the last note of each row becomes the first of the next one, and the intervals of the first series are taken in succession as the starting points of the subsequent ones. Because of this common-tone approach, each row is effectively reduced to just eleven notes. After completing the twelfth row, the pitches start over again from the beginning, omitting from each row the original second member, producing a succession of ten-note series. The section ends part way through the sixth of these reduced rows. The dynamics, like the durations, draw on a field of five levels: f, mf, p, pp, and ppp.

The second section is much longer, extending from bar 30 to bar 271. It is built upon a permuted series of seven character types:

1. groups
2. horizontal-polyphonic
3. sustained notes and points
4. points
5. rapid chords or sounds, polyphonically, with long general pauses
6. chords
7. chords and a few independent notes, legato

These seven types occur four times, permuted as follows:

Zeitmaße (part 2 permutations)
A	B	C	D	E	F	G
C	E	B	A	G	F	D
G	B	E	D	F	C	A
E	A	D	C	F	B	G

These are interlaced with four of the interrupting cadenzas, which are long and complex. All of them are regulated by a single 9 × 9 number square.

The third section has the most complex rhythms (apart from the cadenzas), using duration sets of twelves, nines, sevens, sixes, and fives. It is interrupted in bars 275–289 by the last and shortest of the inserted cadenzas. A sketch found amongst those for Gruppen shows that the twelve tempo-defined subdivisions of the original version are derived from the inversion of the Gruppen row, a fact that had been previously discovered by York Höller through examination of the score. The counting values are varied among crotchet, quaver, and semiquaver. However, the fifth and twelfth elements (E = 66 and G = 80, respectively) are exchanged, probably because the fourth, fifth, and sixth tempos otherwise would have been too close together:

Zeitmaße (part 3 tempos)
C♯	F	C	D♯	G	D	G♯	A♯	A	F♯	B	E
112	70	108	63	80	60	84	96	90	74	102	66
eighth note	quarter note	quarter note	eighth note	quarter note	quarter note	quarter note	quarter note	eighth note	eighth note	quarter note	sixteenth note

The five cadenzas, which account for about two-fifths of the total duration of Zeitmaße, are spliced into the score in such a way as to flow out of and back into the previously composed music, and yet create a perceivable structure of mutual interruption. The first and last cadenzas are the shortest, and the central one by far the longest; the six segments from the original structure, on the contrary, begin and end with the longest values, while the four intermediate ones generally decrease in length. The result is an interlaced pattern of eleven sections, played continuously.

== Reception ==
Terry Riley was heavily influenced by Zeitmaße. In 1959, he composed a heavily chromatic piece for flute, clarinet, bassoon, violin, viola, and cello called Spectra as a response to Stockhausen's quintet.

== Discography ==
In chronological order of recording.

- Stockhausen Text-CD 4. Statistische Form: Von Webern zu Debussy: Vortrag 1954 and Zeitmaße (1955/56): Lesung. Second lecture illustrated with sound examples and a complete performance of Zeitmaße. Meyer-Quintett (Hans-Jürgen Möhring, flute; Wilhelm Meyer, oboe; Richard Hartung, cor anglais; Paul Blöcher, clarinet; Karl Weiß, bassoon). Karlheinz Stockhausen, cond. Recorded 31 January 1957 [enclosed leaflet erroneously says 1956] (mono). 12'50". Kürten: Stockhausen-Verlag, 2007.
- Vega LP C 30 A 139. Domaine Musicale (Jacques Castagner, flute; Claude Maisinneuve, oboe; Paul Taillefer, cor anglais; Guy Deplus, clarinet; André Rabot, bassoon). Pierre Boulez, cond. Karlheinz Stockhausen, artistic director. Recorded June 1957. 14'15". With: Luciano Berio, Serenata I for flute and fourteen instruments (1957). Severino Gazzelloni, flute; soloists of the Domaine Musicale; Pierre Boulez, cond. Pierre Boulez, Sonatina (1946). Severino Gazzelloni, flute; David Tudor, piano. Olivier Messiaen, Cantéyodjayâ (1948). Yvonne Loriod, piano. 1957. Reissued 1985 on Disques Records 14.069 (LP), and again in 2006 on vol. 1 of Pierre Boulez: Le Domaine Musical 1956–1967, Universal Classics France / Accord 476 9209 (5-CD set).
- Columbia Masterworks LP ML 5275. New Directions in Music 1. [The Los Angeles Woodwinds:] Arthur Gleghorn, flute; Donald Muggeridge, oboe; Donald Leake, cor anglais; William Ulyate, clarinet; Donald Christlieb, bassoon. Robert Craft, cond. Recorded in stereo, 21 February, 7 and 8 April 1958, but originally released only in mono. 12'47". With Pierre Boulez, Le Marteau sans maître. Marjorie MacKay, alto; Arthur Gleghorn, flute; Milton Thomas, viola; William Kraft, vibraphone; Dorothy Remsen [misspelt "Remson" on the sleeve], xylorimba; Walter Goodwin, percussion; Theodore Norman, guitar; Robert Craft, cond.) [New York]: Columbia Records, 1958. Issued in Europe in 1960 on Philips A 01488 L. Reissued in 1967 on Odyssey 32 16 0154 (stereo) and 32 16 0153 (mono). Reissued on CD, as Karlheinz Stockhausen, Pierre Boulez: New Directions in Music. Él Records ACMEM193CD. With additional material: Stockhausen, Konkrete Etüde (1952), Klavierstück XI (1956, four versions, David Tudor, piano). London: Él in association with Cherry Red Records, 2010.
- Philips LP 6500 261. Zeitgenössische Musik für Bläser. Members of the Danzi Quintet (Frans Vester, flute; Koen van Slogteren, oboe; Piet Honingh, clarinet; Brian Pollard, bassoon), with Heinz Holliger, cor anglais. (13'15") With: Riccardo Malipiero, Musica da camera; Wolfgang Fortner, Fünf Bagatellen; Hans Werner Henze, Wind Quintet; and Günther Becker, Serpentinata. [Netherlands]: Philips 1971. The recording of Zeitmaße reissued alone on the CD accompanying.
- DGG LP 2530 443. London Sinfonietta (Sebastian Bell, flute; Janet Caxton, oboe; Robin Miller, cor anglais; Antony Pay, clarinet; William Waterhouse, bassoon). Karlheinz Stockhausen, cond. 14'23". With: Stockhausen, Kreuzspiel (1951), Kontra-Punkte (1952–53), and Adieu (1966). All London Sinfonietta; Stockhausen, cond. 1974. Reissued together with Kontra-Punkte and Adieu from this same LP, with the addition of Stop (1965) from DGG 2530 442, on Stockhausen Complete Edition CD 4. Kürten: Stockhausen-Verlag, 2002.
- Wergo CD WER 6717 2. Karlheinz Stockhausen: Kontra-Punkte, Refrain, Zeitmaße, Schlagtrio. The ensemble recherche: Martin Fahlenbock, flute; Jaime González, oboe; Florian Hasel, cor anglais; Shizuyo Oka, clarinet; Mario Kopf, bassoon. (In the other works: Uwe Möckel, bass clarinet; Markus Schwind, trumpet; Andrew Digby, trombone; Jean-Pierre Collot, piano; Klaus-Steffes-Holländer, celesta; Christian Dierstein and Mariko Nishioka, percussion; Beate Anton, harp; Melisa Mellinger, violin; Åsa Åkerberg, cello.) Mainz: Wergo, a division of Schott Music, 2009. Disc reissued as part of Music Of Our Time: 50 Years: 1962–2012. 5-CD set. Wergo 6946. (2012)
- Albany CD TROY1371. Phoenix Ensemble: Karlheinz Stockhausen: Zeitmasze; Arnold Schoenberg: Wind Quintet, op. 26. Phoenix Ensemble: Kelli Kathman, flute (Stockhausen); Erin Lesser, flute (Schoenberg); Carl Oswald, oboe (Stockhausen); Erin Gustafson, oboe (Schoenberg); Keve Wilson, cor anglais; Mark Lieb, clarinet; Gina Cuffari, bassoon; Alana Vegter, horn. Albany, New York: Albany Records US; Kendal, Cumbria: Albany Records UK, 2012.

== Filmography ==
- Stockhausen, Karlheinz. 1972. Musical Forming (Lecture I) Lecture given 13 February 1972 at the Institute of Contemporary Arts, London. Black and white film by Robert Slotover. London: Allied Artists (138 mins.). Released on DVD, Kürten: Stockhausen-Verlag, n.d.
- Stockhausen, Karlheinz. 1992. Zeitmaße. Dress Rehearsal, Introduction and Concert with the Ensemble Modern conducted by Stockhausen at the Alte Oper Frankfurt, August 21, 1992. Colour film by Suzanne Stephens (73 minutes). Kürten: Stockhausen-Verlag.
