= Punctualism =

Musical technique

Olivier Messiaen's unordered series for pitch, duration, dynamics, and articulation from the pre-serial Mode de valeurs et d'intensités, upper division only—which Pierre Boulez adapted as an ordered row for his Structures I

Punctualism (commonly also called "pointillism" or "point music") is a style of musical composition prevalent in Europe between 1949 and 1955 "whose structures are predominantly effected from tone to tone, without superordinate formal conceptions coming to bear". In simpler terms: "music that consists of separately formed particles—however complexly these may be composed—[is called] punctual music, as opposed to linear, or group-formed, or mass-formed music", bolding in the source). This was accomplished by assigning to each note in a composition values drawn from scales of pitch, duration, dynamics, and attack characteristics, resulting in a "stronger individualizing of separate tones". Another important factor was maintaining discrete values in all parameters of the music. Punctual dynamics, for example

mean that all dynamic degrees are fixed; one point will be linked directly to another on the chosen scale, without any intervening transition or gesture. Line-dynamics, on the other hand, involve the transitions from one given amplitude to another: crescendo, decrescendo and their combinations. This second category can be defined as a dynamic glissando, comparable to glissandi of pitch and of tempi (accelerando, ritardando).

"The almost analytical focus on individual events, and then the transition between them, brings a stillness to this music far removed from the gestural quality of other pieces". From a purely technical point of view, the term "punctual" has the sense of "a point of intersection of parameters" in serial music.

Retrospectively attributed to the music of Anton Webern, the term was originally coined in German (punktuelle Musik), by Karlheinz Stockhausen and Herbert Eimert (who also used the expression "star music") to describe pieces such as Olivier Messiaen's "Mode de valeurs et d'intensités" (1949). However, it is most commonly associated with serial compositions such as Pierre Boulez's Structures, book 1 (1952), Karel Goeyvaerts's Sonata for Two Pianos and Nummer 2 for thirteen instruments (1951), Luciano Berio's Nones, and Luigi Nono's Polifonica–Monodia–Ritmica, as well as some early compositions of Stockhausen, such as Kreuzspiel. Herman Sabbe, however, argues that "Stockhausen never strictly speaking composed punctually". Eimert foresaw problems "because of the common term of "pointillism" [German Pointillismus] in French painting. It would wrongly be assumed that paintings by Seurat and his contemporaries were being transformed into music". In painting, pointillism (also termed Neoimpressionism) is a late 19th-century method in which small "points" (dots or strokes) of pure color are deposited on the canvas; seen from a distance, they blend and give the effect of a different color and heightened luminosity. The style, a development of impressionist color theories, was originated by the French painters Georges Seurat and Paul Signac.

The confusion in French was immediate, as Stockhausen relates:

I still remember how, in Paris, I threw around the expression "punctual music" as a term for my KREUZSPIEL, SPIEL for Orchestra, SCHLAGQUARTETT, and so forth. Pierre Boulez corrected me, "Pointilliste, la musique pointilliste!" and I said, "Non, ponctuelle." He replied: "What's that, then? That's not French at all, the word is pointilliste." So I explained: "Non, il faut faire attention, or else people might think we are bringing up musical impressionism ... Seurat painted little dots: dots upon dots, in various colours and sizes, so that a tree would shimmer. ... In terms of technique there is no connection between musical impressionism and pictorial impressionism. That's why I am using the term musique ponctuelle." Both musique ponctuelle and musique pointilliste are still seen today.

In fact, as early as 1922 the French word pointillisme, evoking Seurat's painting technique, had been applied to music in this opposite sense of a "mosaic-like method of construction, an infinite accumulation of small and insignificant inorganic details", with reference to Arnold Schoenberg's operas, Erwartung and Die glückliche Hand.

(An alternative translation for punktuelle Musik/musique ponctuelle is "punctile music", but it has not achieved wide currency.)

The concept and its purpose were first articulated in print by Pierre Boulez, in his 1954 article "Recherches maintenant": "Nevertheless, despite an excess of arithmetic, we had achieved a certain 'punctuality' of sound—by which I mean, literally, the intersection of various functional possibilities in a given point. What had brought this 'punctual' style about? The justified rejection of thematicism".

Punctualism can be used to create various textural threads, referred to as “threads of continuity.” These are identified through various gestures, including pointillistic sustain and intermittent pointillistic sustain.
