= Piece for Piano and Tape (Goeyvaerts) =

Piano composition

Karel Goeyvaerts's Piece for Piano and Tape (Stuk voor piano en geluidsband) was composed in 1964. It explores the potential relations between a live piano performance and a manipulated recording, distributing them around a central axis in the manner of his 1950s serial music's procedures. Goeyvaerts originally thought of synchronizing both parts, but he subsequently decided to contrast the different natures of the fixed recording and the live performance.

== Recordings ==
Jan Michiels. Megadisc, 1996
