= Duration series =

Six-element set of rhythmic values used in Variazioni canoniche (1950) by Luigi Nono

A duration row or duration series is an ordering of a set of durations, in analogy with the tone row or twelve-tone set.

Olivier Messiaen's "Mode de valeurs et d'intensités" is often cited as the first serial piece, but, as well as being predated by Babbitt, both lacks order and views each note as a unit, rather than composing each parameter separately. Messiaen had, however, previously used this chromatic duration series as an ordered set in the opening episode of "Turangalîla 2", a movement from the Turangalîla-Symphonie (1946–48).

In 1946 Milton Babbitt wrote "The Function of Set Structures in the Twelve-Tone System", outlining a theory of complete (total) serialism. Babbitt's Three Compositions for Piano (1947–48) uses the rhythmic set 5-1-4-2 (sum: 12), whose permutation and function varies with each piece. In the first piece this governs the number of attacks within phrases, in the second rhythms are generated as multiples of a unit. (for example: 5×, 1×, etc.)

Babbitt's Composition for Four Instruments (1948) uses a four-element duration row: 1 4 3 2 (the second note is four times the duration of the first, etc.). The duration of the initial note changes every phrase, varying the durations throughout the piece. Babbitt's Composition for Twelve Instruments (1948) uses a twelve-element duration set to serialize the rhythms as well as the pitches. He would later employ an approach based on time-points.

Babbitt's use of rhythm in the latter piece was criticized by Peter Westergaard in Perspectives of New Music: "can we be expected to hear a family resemblance between a dotted half note followed by a sixteenth note (the opening 'interval' of duration set P_{0}) and an eighth note followed by a dotted eighth note (the opening 'interval' of duration set P_{2})?"

Pierre Boulez used the values in Messiaen's piece to order the rhythms in his Structures I (1952). These range from a demisemiquaver (1) to a dotted crotchet (., 12). In Structures Ic, for example, successive durations may be used for successive pitches of a row, or each pitch row may use only one duration, while in Ib new methods are constantly invented.

In 1957 Karlheinz Stockhausen described this additive series as "a subharmonic proportional series" which, "compared to a scale constructed of chromatic intervals, … is a mode", and criticized it because the intervals between successive degrees are perceived as having different sizes (unlike the chromatic scale of pitches). For example, the first four notes equal about 13% of the total duration while the last four equal over 53% (each being 33% of the values). A duration set based on the harmonic series would introduce irrational values.
