= Nummer 2 =

1951 musical composition by Karel Goeyvaerts

Nummer 2 for thirteen instruments (also called Opus 2 for thirteen instruments) is a composition written in 1951 by the Belgian composer Karel Goeyvaerts.

Nummer 2 has been claimed as the first "total serial" composition. though the same claim has been made for Milton Babbitt's Three Compositions for Piano (1947), which predates Goeyvaerts's work by four years.

== Form ==
Nr 2 is in a single movement, but falls into three large sections. Unlike its immediate predecessor in Goeyvaerts's catalog, Nr 1 (1950–51) Sonata for Two Pianos, and two of its serial successors, the electronic Nr 4 met dode tonen (1952) and Nr 5 met zuivere tonen (1953), Nr 2 uses a recurring twelve-tone row (B F♯ F E G A♭ E♭ D A B♭ D♭ C). In the outer sections this row is played monodically by the piano, five times in succession in part one, and five more times in the third section, but in retrograde. Around this linear presentation, in a second layer, the other twelve instruments present the chromatic total several times in a dispersed order with constant permutation. The middle section works in a contrasting manner, presenting pitches in successive groups of either two or three simultaneously sounding instruments, completing the twelve-tone aggregate every eight bars. Pitch repetitions are initially dispersed, but toward the centre become increasingly more concentrated.

== Instrumentation ==
Nr 2 is scored for flute (doubling piccolo), two oboes, two bass clarinets, piano, two violins, two violas, two cellos, and double bass.

== Discography ==
- Goeyvaerts, Karel. The Serial Works [#1–7]. Champ d'Action; Celso Antunes, cond. (in Nr. 2, 3, and 6). Megadisc MDC 7845. Gent: Megadisc Classics, 1998.

== Sources ==
Sources

- Antokoletz, Elliott. 2013. A History of Twentieth-Century Music in a Theoretic-Analytical Context. London and New York: Routledge. ISBN 978-0-415-88187-6.
- Delaere, Mark. 1999. "Auf der Suche nach serieller Stimmigkeit. Goeyvaerts' Weg zur Komposition Nr. 2", in, Die Anfänge der seriellen Musik, edited by Orm Finnendahl, 13–36. Kontexte: Beiträge zur zeitgenössischen Musik 1. Hofheim: Wolke Verlag. ISBN 3-923997-76-0.
- Sabbe, Herman. 1977. Het muzikale serialisme als techniek en als denkmethode: Een onderzoek naar de logische en historische samenhang van de onderscheiden toepassingen van het seriërend beginsel in de muziek van de periode 1950–1975. Ghent: Rijksuniversiteit te Gent.
