= Eduard Pütz =

German composer and music teacher (1911-2000)

Eduard Pütz (13 February 1911, in Illerich – 18 January 2000, in Bad Münstereifel) was a German composer and music teacher.

== Selected works ==
Pütz's scores are published by Schott Music, Edition Tonger, Tonos Musikverlag and Hans Gerig Verlag.

Opera

- Riders to the Sea, Opera in 1 act (1972); libretto by Heinrich Böll after John Millington Synge

Orchestral

- Invention für Barbara for string orchestra (1956)
- Concerto grasso for string orchestra and jazz-combo (1981)
- Blue Fantasy (1996)
- Tagebuchblätter aus Frankreich

Concertante

- Concerto giocoso for piano and orchestra (1979)
- Pyrenäen-Rhapsodie (Pyrenees Rhapsody), 3 Impressions for piano and orchestra (1984)
- Concerto for cello and orchestra (1985)
- Romanze for alto saxophone, cello, string orchestra and percussion (1989)

Chamber music

- Sonatina for cello and piano (1963)
- Improvisation modale for flute and piano (1964)
- Nugae, 7 Little Pieces for recorder, celesta and guitar (1969)
- Ballade für T.S. for guitar (1973)
- Tenso for shakuhachi and guitar (1975)
- 5 Poèmes for violin and piano (1978)
- Canto épico for string quartet (1981)
- Die Marionetten der Ree Loo, Garden Music for violin and piano (1983)
- Meditationen for viola and guitar (1983)
- Frammenti for 4 violas (1986)
- Cries in the Dark, Blues for saxophone and string quartet (1986)
- Lydian Romance for cello and piano (1986)
- "O Welt...", Quartet for oboe, violin, viola and cello (1987)
- Sonata for 7 cellos (1988)
- Sonata for viola and piano (1988)
- Arabeschi capricciosi for flute and guitar (1989)
- Funny Serenades for violin and piano (1989)
- Traumstück for viola and harp (1989)
- Adagietto for cello and piano (1990)
- Blues for Benni for viola and piano (1991)
- Blues Fantasy for 6 cellos (1991)
- Dancing Strings for string quartet (1991)
- Trio for clarinet, cello and piano (1991)
- Tango passionato for 4 cellos (1992)
- Capricious Waltz for flute and piano (1993)
- Twilight Dream for violin and piano (1993)
- Notturno pastorale for oboe and piano (1993)
- Short Stories, 10 Little Pieces for cello and piano (1994)
- Serenade for treble recorder and accordion (1994)
- String Quartet No. 2 (1994)
- Piano Trio (1996)
- Why?, Impressions for 4 saxophones (1996)
- Blue Waltz for flute and piano (1997)
- Jazz Capriccio for alto saxophone and piano (1998)

Harpsichord

- Suite baroque for harpsichord (or piano) (1977)

Organ

- Rosa mystica

Piano

- Sonatina in B♭ (1945)
- Frohes Musizieren, 6 Little Pieces for piano 4-hands (1947)
- Auf dem Rummelplatz, Musik für Hansmartin, Little Pieces (1948)
- Fünf Bagatellen (5 Bagatelles) (1950)
- Sonatina in F (1960)
- Hälfte des Lebens, Klavierstück in 2 movements after a poem by Friedrich Hölderlin (1975)
- Litaniae alle cinque (1976)
- Mr. Clementi Goin' on Holidays, Short Exercises in Blues and Rock Styles (1976)
- Toccata bruta (1976)
- Capriccio, Notturno und Blues (1980)
- 12 Präludien zum Gebrauch an Sonntagnachmittagen (12 Preludes for Use on Sunday Afternoons) (1984)
- Sentimental Serenades (1987)
- I'm Sorry, Mr. Czerny, Little Jazz and Jazz-related Pieces (1988)
- Jazz Sonata (1988)
- Let's Swing, Mr. Bach!, 6 Piano Pieces in "Play-Bach" Style (1991)
- Pas de deux, Petit Ballet for piano 4-hands (1991)
- Waltzing the Blues, 3 Jazz Waltzes (1991)
- Young People's Music Box, 12 Easy Pieces (1992)
- Nachtstücke (Night Music) (1993)
- Let's Play Together, 10 Jazzy Pieces for piano 4-hands (1994)
- How about That, Mr. Offenbach!, Can-Can Fantasy (1995)
- Valsette (1996)
- Jazz-Sonatine (1998)
- Take It Easy, 3 Little Piano Pieces in Jazz Style (2000)

Vocal

- When We Dead Awaken for soprano, flute, electric guitar, electric piano, percussion and double bass (1974); words by Rudi Holzapfel
- Requiem im Park for mezzo-soprano, oboe, clarinet, horn, bassoon, cello, piano and bongos (1980); words by Ursula Claude
- Melodie am Abend for baritone and piano (1981)

Choral

- Johnny John, 5 Impressions for male chorus (1964); words by Hansjochem Kunze
- Der irre Spielmann for mixed chorus (1993); words by Joseph von Eichendorff
- Requiem nach Texten des alten und neuen Testamentes for soprano, tenor, baritone, mixed chorus and orchestra (1994)
