= Composition for Four Instruments =

1948 music composition by Milton Babbitt

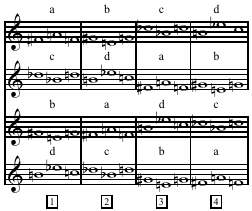
First array of four aggregates (numbered 1–4 at bottom), each vertical line (four trichords labeled a–d) is an aggregate while each horizontal line (four trichords labeled a-d) is also an aggregate.

Composition for Four Instruments (1948) is an early serial music composition written by American composer Milton Babbitt. It is Babbitt's first published ensemble work, following shortly after his Three Compositions for Piano (1947). In both these pieces, Babbitt expands upon the methods of twelve-tone composition developed by Arnold Schoenberg. He is notably innovative for his application of serial techniques to rhythm. Composition for Four Instruments is considered one of the early examples of “totally serialized” music. It is remarkable for a strong sense of integration and concentration on its particular premises—qualities that caused Elliott Carter, upon first hearing it in 1951, to persuade New Music Edition to publish it.

== Structure and analysis ==
Composition for Four Instruments is scored for flute, clarinet, violin, and cello. An immediate division is apparent between the two wind instruments and the two strings. In addition to this, Babbitt makes use of every possible subset of the ensemble group within the different sections of the piece. He uses every combination of instruments only once, saving the full ensemble for the conclusion. The piece can be broken up into fifteen sections according to the subset of instruments playing: four solos, four trios, six duos, one tutti. The instrumental subsets are arranged in complementary pairs, so that each instrument plays only once in every pair of sections. The four solos occur with increasing frequency (at intervals of five, four, and three sections), "converging", so to speak, on the final quartet, which is just two sections after the violin [sic, recte: flute] solo.

Composition for Four Instruments (instrumental list)
1	2	3	4	5	6	7	8	9	10	11	12	13	14	15
	Fl.		Fl.	Fl.		Fl.		Fl.			Fl.	Fl.		Fl.
Cl.		Cl.		Cl.			Cl.	Cl.			Cl.		Cl.	Cl.
	Vn.		Vn.	Vn.			Vn.		Vn.	Vn.			Vn.	Vn.
	Vc.	Vc.			Vc.	Vc.		Vc.		Vc.			Vc.	Vc.

Tone row according to Perle, "explicitly stated only at the conclusion of the work", and Taruskin

The twelve-tone row upon which the entire composition is based is given by the composer as 0 4 1 11 3 2 : 8 6 5 10 7 9, and generates the four main trichords of the piece. It never once appears complete as a melodic succession, however, though several authorsCone 1967 have given different conflicting versions of a row claimed to be "made explicit only in the final section". While the set given by Babbitt concatenates the first trichords of all four instruments in the order of their entrances at the very beginning of the work, Perle's "basic set" from the end of the composition can be transformed into the composer's version "by wholesale inversion plus individual retrogression of the trichords". The pitch array used in the first 35 bars of the piece is as follows:

Composition for Four Instruments (Initial pitch array)
G♭	A	F	G♯	E	G,	C♯	B♭	D	B	D♯	C;	G	E	G♯	F	A	F♯,	C	D♯	B	D	B♭	C♯.
D♭	B♭	D	B	E♭	C,	F♯	A	F	G♯	E	G;	C	E♭	B	D	B♭	C♯,	G	E	G♯	F	A	F♯.
B	E♭	C	C♯	B♭	D,	G♯	E	G	F♯	A	F;	D	B♭	C♯	C	E♭	B,	F	A	F♯	G	E	A♭.
A♭	E	G	F♯	A	F,	B	D♯	C	C♯	B♭	D;	F	A	F♯	G	E	A♭,	D	B♭	D♭	C	E♭	B.

The first section of the piece begins with a solo in the clarinet, using the (014) trichord or its retrograde. The notes of this solo are separated by register into four distinct voices, though the notes of any one trichord are usually interrupted by notes from other trichords in other registers, making it hard to hear these structures individually. Babbitt presents several instances of tone rows in the opening bars of the piece. A note-by-note analysis of the first nine measures reveals two such tone rows, the first beginning at measure one and the second at measure seven. A closer look at the separation of the opening into the four registers reveals two additional tone rows. The set of notes contained in the two high registers form a tone row, as do the notes in the lower two registers.

The piece begins with a three-note motive, or trichord (a collection of three distinct pitch classes), in the next-to-lowest register: B–E♭–C, with a succession of +4 then −3 semitone intervals. The following measures present three transformations of this opening trichord, in retrograde-inversion, retrograde, and inverse forms (D♭–B♭–D, G♭–A–F, and A♭–E–G, respectively) separated into the mid-high, high, and lowest registers, respectively (therefore with interval patterns of −3 +4, −4 + 3, and −4 +3). However, these three trichords overlap in time, so that the temporal order of the nine notes is D♭–G♭–A♭–E–B♭–A–G–D–F. In this way, the twelve-tone aggregate is compositionally ordered into a chromatic, thematic surface, with the properties of another ordered set underneath it. The clarinet solo continues by adding more forms of the basic trichord until a complete twelve-tone aggregate is unfolded in each register.

As a result, seeking for "the row" caused "even the friendliest people" to become baffled and resentful, because of a fundamental misunderstanding about Babbitt's approach to his material:

That's not the way I conceive of a set. This is not a matter of finding the lost set. This is not a matter of cryptoanalysis (where's the hidden set?). What I'm interested in is the effect it might have, the way it might assert itself not necessarily explicitly.

The entire opening clarinet solo can be analyzed as an array of these trichords—an "array"" being two or more simultaneous sets presented in such a way that the sums of their horizontal segments form columnar twelve-tone aggregates—and their various inversions and retrogrades. The trichordal relationships between the notes in the four registers of the clarinet foreshadow the interaction between the four instrument voices in the conclusion of the piece. Also, the way in which the instruments unfold throughout the piece directly corresponds to the progression of the trichords in the clarinet solo. The organization of the pitch classes throughout the piece is consistently and undeniably self-referential.

In addition to his use of multi-dimensional tone rows, Babbitt also serialized rhythmic patterns. He uses the duration row as his primary rhythmic structure in Composition for Four Instruments, each of which consist of four different durations. The durations can be represented by the sequence of numbers 1 4 3 2: the second note is four times the duration of the first, etc. The duration of the initial note changes every phrase, varying the durations throughout the piece. For example, the first four notes of the opening clarinet solo follow the 1 4 3 2 duration pattern. This rhythmic pattern is then manipulated under the same transformations as the pitches in a tone row. These transformations include the retrograde (2 3 4 1), the inversion (4 1 2 3) and the retrograde inversion (3 2 1 4). Babbitt expands this idea in later pieces, for example working instead with a set of twelve unique durational units in Composition for Twelve Instruments.

As he does in the pitch domain, Babbitt achieves additional variety in the rhythmic patterns of Composition for Four Instruments by manipulating the duration row and its three variations in different ways. At times, he expands the row by multiplying each duration in the pattern by the four other members. Applying this transformation to the original row 1 4 3 2 results in the duration rows 1 4 3 2, 4 16 12 8, 3 12 9 6, and 2 8 6 4. Following the same procedure with the multipliers for the retrograde, 2 3 4 1, yields 4 6 8 2, 6 9 12 3, 8 12 16 4, 2 3 4 1. The inversion of the multipliers is 4 1 2 3, and the retrograde inversion is 3 2 1 4, producing 16 4 8 12, 4 1 2 3, 8 2 4 6, 12 3 6 9, and 9 6 3 12, 6 4 2 8, 3 2 1 4, 12 8 4 16, respectively. In the final three bars of the piece, the clarinet plays the retrograde of the opening duration row with each element multiplied by 4, giving the pattern 8 12 16 4.

Composition for Four Instruments holds a significant position as one of the early serial compositions, which draws from and reinvents techniques introduced in the work of Arnold Schoenberg and Anton Webern. Babbitt continued to explore serialism throughout his career.

== Discography ==
- Milton Babbitt: Composition for Four Instruments (1948), Composition for Viola and Piano (1950); John Bavicchi: Trio No. 4, op. 33, Short Sonata for Violin and Harpsichord, op. 39. John Wummer (flute), Stanley Drucker (clarinet), Peter Marsh (violin), Donald McCall (cello); Walter Trampler (viola), Alvin Bauman (piano); David Glazer (clarinet), Matthew Raimondi (violin), Assunta Dell'Aquila (harp); Robert Brink (violin), Daniel Pinkham (harpsichord). LP recording, 1 sound disc, 33⅓ rpm., 12 in. CRI 138. New York: Composers Recordings, 1960.
- Contemporary American Chamber Music. Volume 9: Elliott Carter, Sonata for flute, oboe, cello, and harpsichord (1952); Milton Babbitt, Composition for Four Instruments, for flute, clarinet, violin, and cello; Igor Stravinsky, Fanfare for a New Theatre, for two trumpets; Henry Brant, Angels and Devils, concerto for flute and flute orchestra. New England Conservatory of Music Chamber Players (David Reskin, flute; Tom Hill, clarinet; Michael Levin, violin; Ronald Thomas, cello; John Heiss, cond.). New England Conservatory Series. LP recording, 1 sound disc, analog, 33⅓ rpm, stereo, 12 in. Golden Crest NEC 109. Huntington Station, New York: Golden Crest Records, 1975.
- Slowly Expanding Milton Babbitt Album: Composition for Four Instruments (1948). Rachel Beetz (flute); Joshua Rubin (clarinet); Erik Carlson (violin); Michael Nicolas (cello), produced by Erik Carlson, 2018.

== Listening ==
- Composition for Four Instruments on the Slowly Expanding Milton Babbitt Album(since 2018), produced by Erik Carlson
