= Pour que les fruits mûrissent cet été =

Pour que les fruits mûrissent cet été (In Order That the Fruits Will Ripen This Summer) is a composition by the Belgian composer Karel Goeyvaerts, for seven musicians playing fourteen Renaissance instruments. It was composed either in 1975 or 1976. A second version for modern instruments was made in 1988.

== History ==
Pour que les fruits mûrissent cet été was written for the seven musicians of the Florilegium Musicum of Paris (Jean-Claude Malgoire, Jean-Claude Veilhan, Jean-Marie Nicolas, Françoise Bloch, Monique Bouret, Jacques Prat, and Jacques Bidart), each of whom is capable of performing on a number of different instruments. Goeyvaerts chose fourteen instruments for his composition: positive organ, lute, soprano shawm, bombarde (tenor shawm), two crumhorns, hautbois de Poitou, (Note: The hautbois de Poitou is similar to the rauschpfeife.) rackett, two recorders, discant fiddle, viola da gamba, baroque violin, and rebec. The year of composition is given variously as 1975 and 1976. In 1988, Goeyvaerts made a new version under the Dutch translation of the title, Voor het rijpen van de zomervruchten, for a chamber ensemble of eleven instruments (flute, oboe, clarinet, bassoon, horn, trumpet, trombone, harp, violin, viola, and cello).

== Analysis ==
In 1975, Goeyvaerts began working with a personal interpretation of minimalism. Pour que les fruits is one of the earliest pieces composed in this new style, which the composer described as "evolving repetitive technique". A rhythmic cell within a fixed time-span is repeated and a new element added with every repetition. Once the cell is complete, it starts gradually to disintegrate. Goeyvaerts's minimalism of the later 1970s and 1980s, like that of most other European minimalists, uses a fully chromatic language, but Pour que les fruits is, like most American minimalism, diatonic. Goeyvaerts's choice in this case is undoubtedly conditioned by the instruments, which were designed to produce diatonic scales. A chromatic tonal language is consequently against their nature.

Although the work presents itself as a continuous process, all in a unifying tempo of = 120 and constant 3/4 meter, it nevertheless is divided into five large sections, seamlessly connected without any breaks, but marked in the score as sections A through E.

== Discography ==
- Karel Goeyvaerts: Amor[t]. Contents: Bélise dans un jardin and Improperia, cantata for Good Friday (Vinius Municipal Choir "Jauna Muzika" and instrumental ensemble, cond. Koen Kessels; recorded Vilnius Recording Studio, September 1999); Mon doux Pilote s'endort aussi (Flemish Radio Choir, cond. Johan Duijck; recorded Jesuit Chapel, Heverlee, October 1998); Erst das Gesicht, dann die Hände, und zuletzt erst das Haar (Champ d'Action, cond. Koen Kassels; recorded by VRT Radio3 at deSingel, December 1998); Avontuur (Jan Michiels, piano; Prometheus Ensemble and Champ d'Action, cond. Peter Rundel; recorded Luna Theatre, Brussels, October 1996); Zomerspelen (BRT Symphony Orchestra, cond. Gianpiero Taverna; recorded at Studio 4 BRT-Flagey, October 1975); Pourque les fruits mûrissent cet été (Florilegium Musicum de Paris; recorded at VRT Studios, January 1976). CD recording, 2 discs: stereo, 12 cm.. Megadisc MDC 7829/30. Ghent: Megadisc, 2000.

== Notes and references ==
Notes

Sources

- Beirens, Maarten. 2003. "Minimalist Techniques from a European Perspective. An Analysis of Pour que les fruits mûrissent cet été by Karel Goeyvaerts". Revue belge de Musicologie / Belgisch Tijdschrift voor Muziekwetenschap 57:215–229.
- Delaere, Mark. 2001. "Goeyvaerts, Karel (August)". The New Grove Dictionary of Music and Musicians, 2nd edition, edited by Stanley Sadie and John Tyrrell. London: Macmillan.
- Knockaert, Yves. 2000. Booklet notes (Dutch, English, and French) accompanying Karel Goeyvaerts: Amor[t]. 2-CD set. Megadisc MDC 7829/30. Ghent: Megadisc.
- Lysens, Jef, and Diana von Volborth-Danys. 1994. "Karel Goeyvaerts: A Chronological Survey of Works". Revue belge de Musicologie / Belgisch Tijdschrift voor Muziekwetenschap 48 (TheArtistic Legacy of Karel Goeyvaerts: A Collection of Essays): 15–34.
