= Sonata for Two Pianos (Goeyvaerts) =

Chamber music work by Karel Goeyvaerts

Sonata for Two Pianos (1950–51), also called simply Opus 1 or Nummer 1, is a chamber music work by Belgian composer Karel Goeyvaerts, and a seminal work in the early history of European serialism.

== History ==
Goeyvaerts composed the sonata during the winter of 1950–51, and brought the score with him when he attended the Darmstädter Ferienkurse in the Summer of 1951. There he met Karlheinz Stockhausen, five years his junior and at the time and a student in his last year at the Cologne Conservatory. Goeyvaert's and Stockhausen's analysis and performance of the second movement of the Sonata in Theodor W. Adorno's composition seminar had considerable significance for those young composers eager to develop serial thinking. The influence of the Sonata is also evident in Stockhausen's early serial compositions, particularly Kreuzspiel, which Stockhausen began composing on his way home from Darmstadt and finished on 4 November 1951. Adorno, however, did not appreciate the qualities of the work's second movement, because he could not find any motivic coherence in it. When Goeyvaerts found it difficult to defend himself in German (a language in which he was not fluent), Stockhausen stood up for his friend, telling Adorno, "you are looking for a chicken in an abstract painting".

Although originally titled Sonata for Two Pianos, Goeyvaerts later sought to accentuate the innovative intent of the work by referring to it simply as Opus 1 or Nummer 1.

== Material and form ==
The Sonata for Two Pianos is in four movements, which are simply designated with Roman numerals and metronome markings. Movements I and II are presented in retrograde to form movements III and IV—a pattern that may have been suggested by the four sections of the first piece in Olivier Messiaen's Livre d'orgue.

It is among the earliest examples of multiple or integral serialism, though it is something of a hybrid work. The outer movements relapse into older patterns and do not exhibit the technical purity and perfection of structural organisation found in the middle movements. It was only with his Nummer 2 for 13 instruments that Goeyvaerts found a way of composing in which absolutely everything, from the overall form down to the tiniest detail, is governed by one and the same serial principle. The second movement in particular, with its isolated tones, is an example of punctual music.

The pitch organisation is not based on a twelve-tone row, but rather on a fourteen-note structure, organised into pairs of seven-note sets. With reference to the chromatic total, these sets are complementary, except they both include the two pitches A and E♭. A possible model is the fourteen-tone series serving as the theme of the variation movement in Schoenberg's Serenade Op. 24.

One technique used in the Sonata to preserve an equilibrium amongst several parameters is the "synthetic number". This term was coined by Goeyvaerts and Stockhausen to describe a homeostatic system based on the reconciliation of tendencies, where an increase in one dimension (e.g., duration) results in a decrease in another dimension (e.g., loudness). The method used in the Sonata involves combining the numerical values assigned to the elements in each of four parameters (pitch, duration, loudness, and mode of attack) such that their sum will always be 7.

== Discography ==
- Fünfzig Jahre neue Musik in Darmstadt. Vol. 1. CD recording. Col Legno WWE 1CD 31894. Includes Goeyvaerts: Sonata for Two Pianos (second movement), performed by the composer and Karlheinz Stockhausen. Munich: Col Legno, 1996.
- Goeyvaerts, Karel. The Serial Works [#1–7]. ChampdAction (Jan Michiels and Inge Spinette, pianos, in Nr. 1). Megadisc MDC 7845. Gent: Megadisc Classics, 1998.
