= Aquarius (opera) =

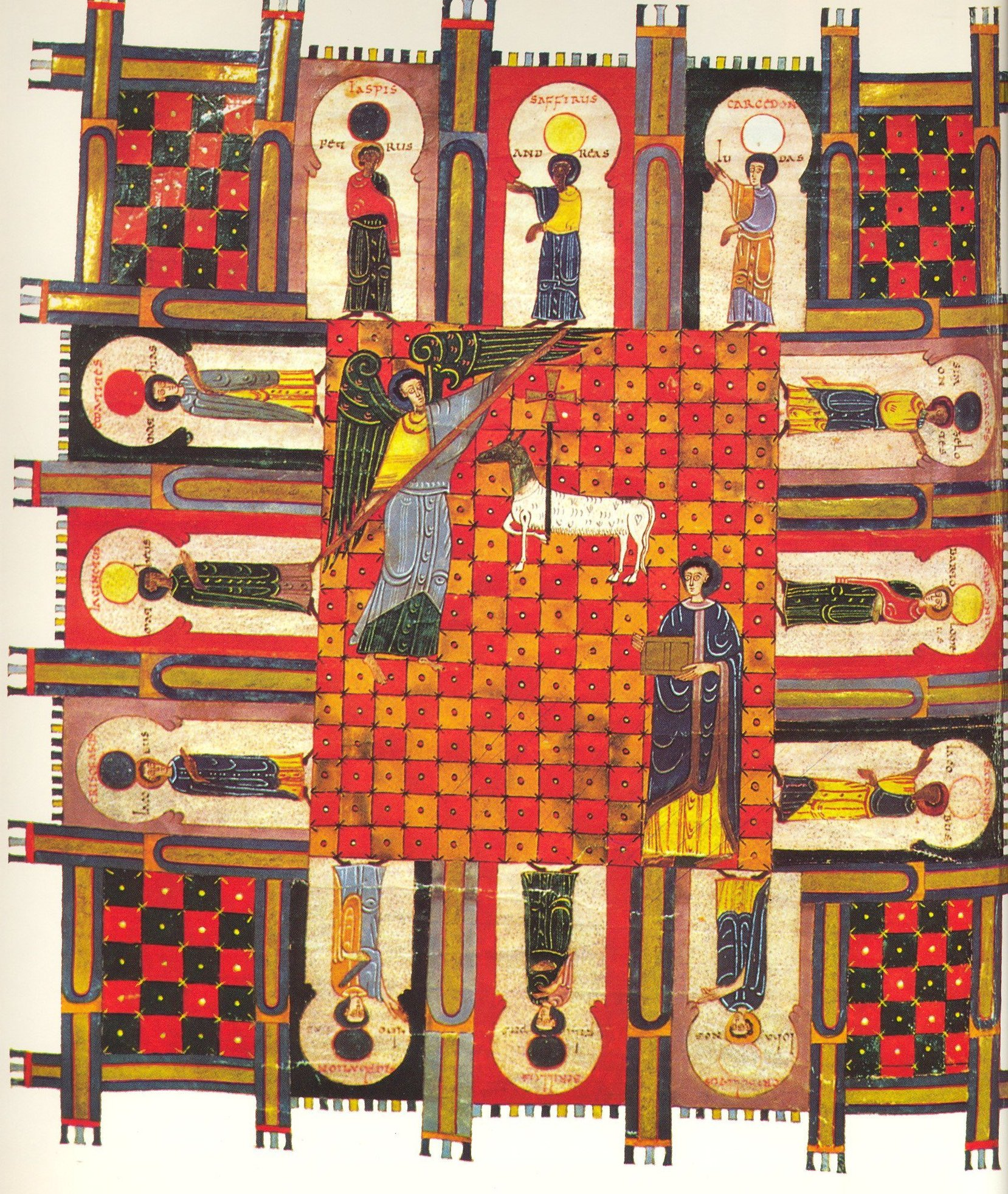
Beatus of Liébana: "The New Jerusalem", Beatus of Facundo / Commentary on the Apocalypse

Aquarius is an opera for eight sopranos, eight baritones, and orchestra by Karel Goeyvaerts. It was begun in 1983 and completed in April 1992, to a libretto by the composer in eight languages, incorporating lines from the Book of Revelation.

== History ==
Aquarius in its final form is an opera, but its composition involved a number of preliminary pieces for various forces, so that Goeyvaerts preferred to speak of the "Aquarius project". Goeyvaerts's inspiration came from principally four sources: Marilyn Ferguson's book The Aquarian Conspiracy (which he was given in 1983 by his friend Boudewijn Buckinx), the astrological theory of epochs, the Revelation of St. John, and the commentary on the Apocalypse by the 8th-century exegete Beatus of Liébana

Because no large, single commission for the entire opera was initially offered, Goeyvaerts set about composing the components separately, often for smaller forces than he intended for the definitive version. In this way, nearly all of his works from 1983 onward are related to Aquarius in one way or another. At last a commission from the Brussels Opera and deSingel, later joined by Antwerp '93, enabled Goeyvaerts to complete the opera in April 1992. When he suddenly died on 3 February 1993, he had not finished correcting the manuscript for publication. This task was carried out by Mark De Smet.

== Other works of the Aquarius project ==
- Aquarius I (Voorspel)—L’Ère du Verseau, for orchestra (1983)
- Aquarius-Tango, for solo piano (January 1984)
- De Zang van Aquarius (The Song of Aquarius), for eight bass clarinets (July 1984)
- Zum Wassermann, for 14 musicians (August 1984)
- Les Voix de Verseau, version of De Zang van Aquarius, for soprano, flute, clarinet, violin, cello, and piano (1985)
- Pas à pas, for solo piano (1985, a shortened version of part 4 of Aquarius)
- De Heilige Stad (The Holy City), for chamber orchestra (August 1986)
- De Zeven Segels, for string quartet (December 1986)
- Aanloop en kreet (Run and Cry), for symphony orchestra and chorus (July 1987)
- …want de tijd is nabij (Because the Time Is Near), for male chorus and strings (February 1989)
- Aquarius stage cantata, for eight sopranos and 15 instrumentalists (August–September 1989)
- De Zang van Aquarius, version for symphony orchestra (1991)
- Opbouw (Construction), for orchestra (1991)

== Libretto ==
The libretto does not consist of the conventional succession of vocal monologues, dialogues, and ensembles, and there is no narrative structure to the text. Goeyvaerts wrote most of the text himself, setting out at the beginning of the opera with non-semantic nonsense syllables and onomatopoeias, moving gradually to the use of more suggested and meaningful words until, in the final scene, coherent lines from the Revelation of St. John are sung in eight languages (Latin, Greek, Dutch, French, German, English, Spanish, and Italian). In this way there is a progression of increasing comprehensibility toward the final scene, which is the only part of the entire libretto where one can reasonably speak of the semantic use of language.

== Premiere cast ==
The staged premiere on Tuesday, 9 June 2009, in Antwerp was a co-production of the Holland Festival and the Vlaamse Opera. On 21 June 2009 the production was brought to the Muziekgebouw aan 't IJ in Amsterdam. The performers were the Radio Filharmonisch Orkest and the Nederlands Kamerkoor, conducted by Alejo Pérez.

== Synopsis ==
Aquarius concerns the search for and experience of a new and better society in the Age of Aquarius. The leading feature of this new society is perfect harmony between everyone's abilities his/her place in society. Goeyvaerts found the essential issue not to be the arrival of the traditional idea of the Aquarian society, but that a new society will replace the existing one. Aquarius is intended as a kind of initiational ritual into the secrets of this new society for everyone attending a performance. According to the composer, Aquarius is not about the individual's experiences or conflicts, but rather is a drama of society—today's society, viewed as being in a gradual transition to new relationships between people which can already be observed sporadically. Society is represented on the stage by groups of dancers and singers, and the relationships within these groups represent the evolving structure of society. In Goeyvaerts's own words:

=== Act 1 ===
Prologue
The orchestral prologue represents the stiffness of the strict limitation of personal enthusiasm by a constrained existence within the "letter of the law".
Scene 1
The first scene is sung by all sixteen soloists with the orchestra, and represents the kind of spirited outbreak of vitality in an urge for independence characterized by the events of May 1968. Such spirit issues from the growth in awareness of one's own nature.
Scene 2
Scene two is for the eight sopranos and orchestra: eight women foresee new forms of society in an intuitive approach. They are a balanced group, pulling close together in eight phases, each is based on a harmonic situation of its own, represented visually by particular relations between the eight characters.
Scene 3
A ballet scene with orchestra, presenting a "masculine" approach of the formation of rational constructions: the new society is seen from a rational basis, with new laws.
Scene 4 and finale
At first just the orchestra, later joined by the sixteen singers. Up to this point, everything occurs from the viewpoint of "leading" figures: the "prima donna", the "politician", and so on. Their individual views cause clashes and, in the end, confusion, with a cry for help: "AIUTO!!!"

=== Act 2 ===
Prologue
The orchestra bursts forth like a whirlwind, accompanied visually by evocative projections on a screen.
Scene 1
The 8 sopranos and 8 baritones join the orchestra, as a crowd in an immense room, lifted up by the suction force of the whirlwind.
Scene 2
The orchestra accompanies a ballet in a tempo giusto like a dance in low gravity: a peaceful dance above invisible ground.
Scene 3
The sixteen singers (accompanied by the orchestra) explore a new environment, in a realization of connections with the earth, ending in an image of complete peace and radiant harmony.
Finale
The singers and orchestra join with the ballet in a concluding tutti, with the themes of "subtlety" and "non-passivity," using images from the Beatus miniatures in the Biblioteca Nacional in Madrid.

== Discography ==
- Karel Goeyvaerts: Aquarius: L'Ère du Verseau. Megadisc Classics MDC 7850/51. Gent: Megadisc, 1997.
- Karel Goeyvaerts: Works for Piano [1964–1990]. Jan Michiels (piano), with Dietmar Wiesner (tape recorder), Trio Ikhoor, Carlos Bruneel (flute), Takashi Yamane (bass clarinet). CD recording. Megadisc Classics MDC 7848. Gent: Megadisc, 1996. Includes Aquarius: Tango (1984), and Pas à pas (1985), both from Aquarius, as well as Piano Quartet with Tape Recorder (1972, two versions), Stuk voor Piano (1964), Voor Harrie, Harry en René (1990), and Litanie 1 (1979).
- Karel Goeyvaerts: String Quartets. De Zeven Segels (1986), Voor Strijkkwartet (1992). Danel Quartet, Megadisc Classics MDC 7853. Gent: Megadisc, 1996.
