= Karel Goeyvaerts =

Belgian composer (1923–1993)

Karel August Goeyvaerts (8 June 1923 – 3 February 1993) was a Belgian composer.

== Life ==
Goeyvaerts was born in Antwerp, where he studied at the Royal Flemish Music Conservatory; he later studied composition in Paris with Darius Milhaud and analysis with Olivier Messiaen. He also studied ondes Martenot with Maurice Martenot, who invented the instrument.

In 1951, Goeyvaerts attended the famous Darmstadt New Music Summer School where he met Karlheinz Stockhausen, who was five years his junior. Both were devout Catholics and found ways of integrating religious numerology into their serial compositions. They found themselves deep in conversation, and performed a movement from Goeyvaerts's "Nummer 1", Sonata for Two Pianos, in the composition course by Theodor Adorno there. They were both astonished upon hearing for the first time Messiaen's "Mode de valeurs et d'intensités" (from Quatre études de rythme), in a recording by the composer which Antoine Goléa played at a lecture. These experiences together convinced Stockhausen he should study with Messiaen.

Goeyvaerts became excited in 1952 when he learned that Stockhausen had access in Paris to a generator of sine waves. Goeyvaerts saw them as an important discovery for music: the purest sound possible. At the time, Stockhausen did not share his enthusiasm, owing partly to the inability with the equipment at hand to superimpose sine tones. Only later, after taking up his new post at the NWDR Electronic Music Studio in Cologne, did Stockhausen find more suitable equipment, in July 1953. One of the first works produced there was Goeyvaerts's Nr. 5 with Pure Tones, which Stockhausen helped his friend to realize. (When Stockhausen seemingly abandoned his work with sine waves and returned to writing compositions for solo piano, Goeyvaerts felt that Stockhausen was abandoning an important discovery and took up the matter from a philosophical point of view himself.)

There has been some controversy about who wrote the first European "total" serial composition. His Nummer 2 (1951) for 13 instruments is one of the contenders, as is his Nummer 1 (1950) Sonata for Two Pianos, and the Sonata for Two Pianos by Michel Fano (1950), depending on definitions of "total serialism".

After withdrawing from the musical world for a while, he accepted a position in 1970 at the Institute for Psychoacoustic and Electronic Music (IPEM) in Ghent, which led to several other appointments in Belgium. His works from after 1975 take on aspects of minimalism, the best-known examples being his series of five Litanies (1979–82) and his final work, the opera Aquarius (1983–92). Though minimalism is ordinarily thought of as a reaction against serialism, for Goeyvaerts both techniques were merely subcategories of a non-dynamic, "static music". Analyses of his early serial compositions (especially the electronic Nr. 4, met dode tonen [with dead tones] and Nr. 5, met zuivere tonen [with pure tones]) reveal how close the connections actually are. Goeyvaerts died suddenly in 1993 in his home city of Antwerp.

== Selected works ==
- Opera: Aquarius (L'ère du verseau) (1983–92)
- Orchestra
  - Violin Concerto No. 1 (1948)
  - Violin Concerto No. 2 (1951)
  - Zomerspelen (1961)
  - Al naar gelang (1971)
  - Litanie III (1980)
  - Aquarius (concert version) (1991)
- Ensemble
  - Tre Lieder per sonar a venti-sei (1949)
  - Nr. 2 voor 13 instrumenten (1951)
  - Nr. 3 met gestreken en geslagen tonen (1952)
  - Nr. 6 met 180 klankvoorwerpen (1954)
  - Pour que les fruits mûrissent cet été, for 14 Renaissance instruments, played by seven musicians (1975 or 1976)
  - Erst das Gesicht... (1978)
  - Zum Wassermann (1984)
  - Avontuur (1985)
  - De Heilige Stad (1986)
  - Das Haar (1990)
- Vocal-instrumental
  - Elegische muziek (1950)
  - Mis voor Paus Johannes XXIII (1968)
  - Bélise dans un jardin (1972)
  - Litanie IV, for soprano, flute, clarinet, piano, violin, and cello (1981)
  - De Stemmen van de Waterman (1985)
- Choir: Mon doux pilote s'endort aussi (1976)
- Chamber music
  - Op. 1, Sonata for 2 pianos (1951)
  - Ach Golgatha!, for percussion, harp, and organ (1975)
  - Honneurs funèbres à la tête musicale d'Orphée, for 6 ondes Martenot (1978)
  - Litanie II, for 3 percussionists (1980)
  - Aemstel Kwartet (1985)
  - De Zeven Zegels, for string quartet (1986)
  - Voor Strijkkwartet (1992)
- Piano
  - Litanie I (1979)
  - Pas à Pas (1985)
- Tape:
  - Nr. 4 met dode tonen (1952)
  - Nr. 5 met zuivere tonen (1953)
  - Nr. 7 met convergerende en divergerende niveaus (1955)
  - Nachklänge aus dem Theater I–II (1972)
- Instrument(s) plus tape:
  - Stuk voor piano en tape (1964)
  - Piano Quartet (1972)
  - You'll Never Be Alone Anymore (1975)
  - Litanie V, for harpsichord and tape (1982)
