= Nummer 5 =

Nummer 5 met zuivere tonen (Number 5 with Pure Tones) is a musical work by the Belgian composer Karel Goeyvaerts, realized at the WDR Studio for Electronic Music in 1953 and one of the earliest pieces of electronic music.

== History ==
A first version of the work was written by March 1953, but it was only after his friend Karlheinz Stockhausen had finished his Studie I in November that Goeyvaerts was able to come to Cologne to realize his work. In the meantime, Goeyvaerts made a revised version of his score, probably in the Autumn, with a much more complex web of proportions over the entire composition that appears to have been influenced by Stockhausen's Studie. Goeyvaerts was given technical assistance by Stockhausen in realising his work. The premiere of Goeyvarts's composition was given on 19 October 1954 on the inaugural concert of works produced in the WDR studio, together with the first performances of six other pieces: Stockhausen's Studie I and Studie II, Herbert Eimert's Glockenspiel and Etüde über Tongemische, Paul Gredinger's Formanten I/II, and Henri Pousseur's Seismogramme. Eimert emphatically titled these pieces "Die sieben Stücke" (The Seven Pieces), and long maintained that this was the first concert of electronic music. In retrospect, Goeyvaerts was unhappy with Nummer 5 as a finished product, because it demonstrated that absolute certainty lay outside his grasp.

== Analysis ==
The "pure tones" of the subtitle refer to sine tones, from which the various sounds used in the piece are compounded. The work is characterised by stillness, possessing a non-dialectical mode of proceeding so that its harmonic proportions need not exclude an equilibrium of elements. A second force is responsible for the piece’s form: it is exactly symmetrical: not only does each event in the second half of the piece occur according to an axis of symmetry at the exact centre, but each event itself is reversed. It is a perfect example of Goeyvaerts's aesthetics, the perfect example of the imperfection of perfection. All the relations among the parametric values are derived from the arithmetic series of the integers from 1 to 11. This series defines not only the numbers of elements, but also the relations between the values of these elements. Within the individual composite tones this applies not only to the relations between the component tones but also to the relations between the various composite sounds.

== Discography ==
- Goeyvaerts, Karel. The Serial Works [#1–7] . Champ d'Action. Megadisc MDC 7845. Gent: Megadisc Classics, 1998.
- Early Electronic Music: Cologne—WDR. CD recording BVHAAST 9106. Amsterdam : BV HAAST Records, 1999. Herbert Eimert and Robert Beyer, Klang im unbegrenzten Raum and Klangstudie II; Herbert Eimert, Klangstudie I, and Glockenspiel; Karel Goeyvaerts, Nr 5 and Nr 7; Paul Gredinger, Formaten I und II; Gottfried Michael Koenig, Klangfiguren I; Henri Pousseur, Seismogramme I–II; Bengt Hambraeus, Doppelrohr II; Franco Evangelisti, Incontri di fasce sonore; György Ligeti, Glissandi and Artikulation; Giselher Klebe, Interferenzen; Herbert Brün, Anepigraphe.
