= Quatre Études de rythme =

Four piano pieces by Olivier Messiaen

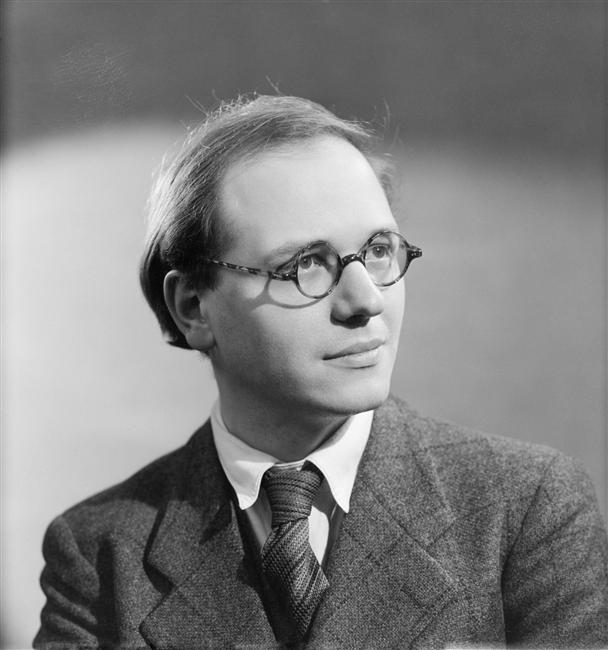
Olivier Messiaen in 1937

Quatre Études de rythme (Four Rhythm Studies) is a set of four piano compositions by Olivier Messiaen, written in 1949 and 1950. A performance of them lasts between 15 and 20 minutes.

== History ==
The four pieces which the composer collectively termed Études de rythme are not a "cycle" like Messiaen's earlier Vingt Regards sur l'enfant-Jésus (1944) or Visions de l’Amen (1943). Messiaen composed "Neumes rythmiques" and "Mode de valeurs et d’intensités" in 1949 (the latter at Darmstadt) and added the other two études in the following year, when he was at Tanglewood.

The four movements were premiered on 6 November 1950 in Tunis (at that time under the French protectorate of Tunisia) by the composer himself, who shortly afterward made the first recording of the études. The French premiere was given in Toulouse on 7 June 1951 by Yvonne Loriod.

== Analysis ==
The work consists of four movements:

1. "Île de Feu I" (Fire Island I)
2. "Mode de valeurs et d'intensités" (Mode of Durations and Intensities)
3. "Neumes rythmiques" (Rhythmic Neumes)
4. "Île de Feu II" (Fire Island II)

=== I. "Île de Feu I" ===
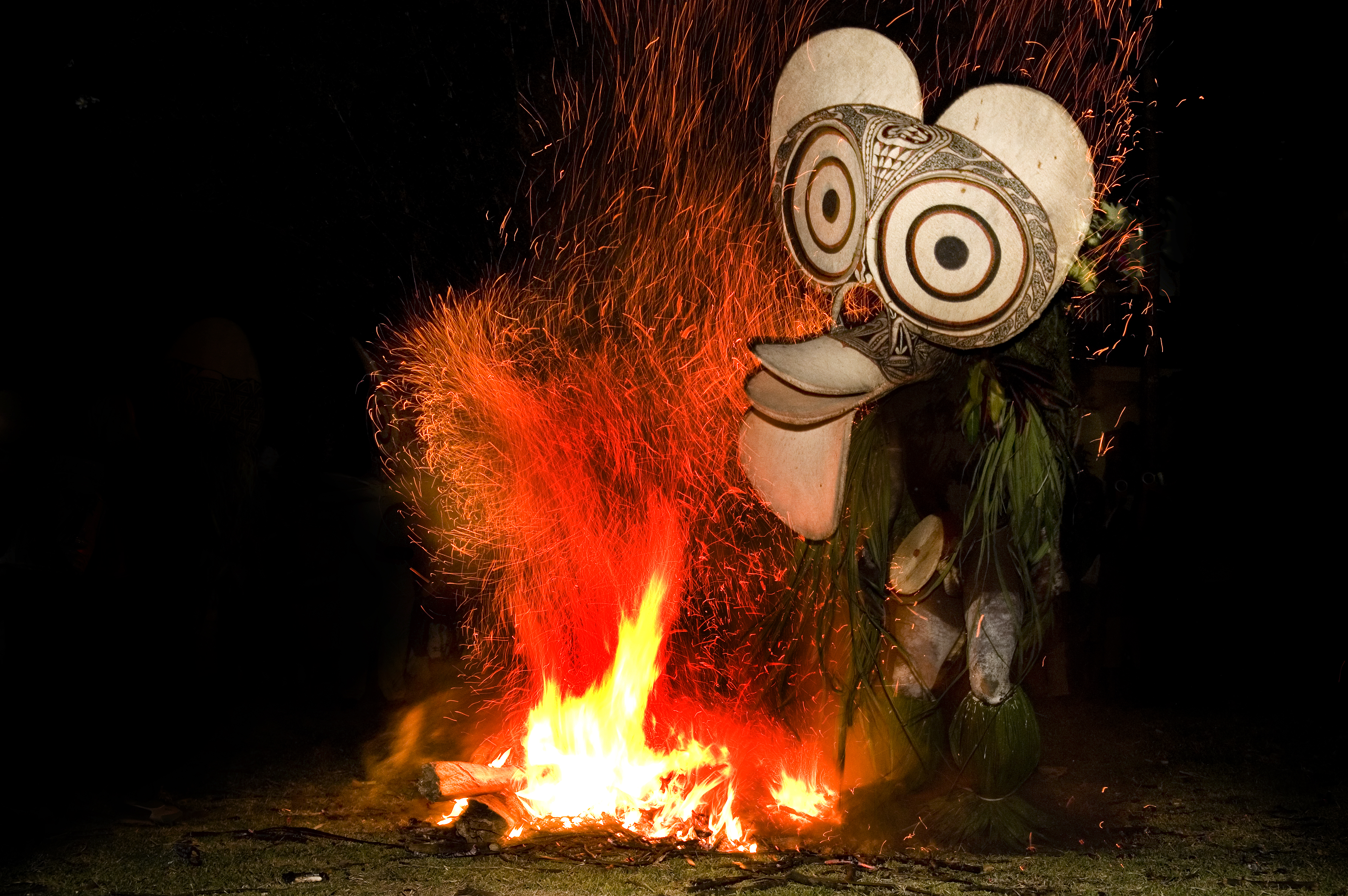
Baining firedancers, Papua New Guinea

The title refers to Papua New Guinea, and the thematic material of this movement has "all the violence of the magic rites of this country". The piece consists of five sections, in alternating pairs of musical ideas. The first part of each section is a melodic theme with accompaniment, the second is a departure which Messiaen calls a trait ("episode"). The first section consists of a thematic statement and trait. The first half of the next three develop the initial theme. The fifth and final section introduces a new, longer theme in two periods which are immediately repeated before the etude is concluded by a final trait amounting to a short coda.

=== II. "Mode de valeurs et d'intensités" ===
This movement is the most-discussed of the four, as the first work by a European composer to apply numerical organisation to pitch, duration, dynamics, and mode of attack (timbre). Because the treatment of the parameters is modal and not serial (that is, the elements are treated simply as a scale, without any implications for how they are to be ordered), there is no question of the material determining the work's form. According to the composer's own description, there are separate modes composed of 36 pitches, 24 durations, 12 attacks, and 7 dynamics. The duration scale is separated into three overlapping scales, called "tempi" by the composer, which correspond to the high, middle, and low registers of the piano, and occur in simultaneous superimposition. The first tempo uses 12 chromatic durations applied to the demisemiquaver, the second does the same with the semiquaver unit, and the third with the quaver.

According to Messiaen:

The durations, intensities and attacks operate on the same plane as the pitches; the combination of modes reveals colors of durations and intensity; each pitch of the same name has a different duration, attack and intensity for each register in which it appears; the influence of register upon the quantitative, phonetic, and dynamic soundscape, and the division into three temporal regions imbues the passage with the spirit of the sounds that traverse them, creating the potential for new variations of colors.

=== III. "Neumes rythmiques" ===
The first of the four to be composed, this étude alternates two separate sets of refrains with longer strophes given over to the rhythmic neumes of the title. The first set of refrains is marked "rythme en ligne triple: 1 à 5, 6 à 10, 11 à 15", which means there are three durations, short, medium, and long, which are progressively expanded, upon each repetition, by the addition of a semiquaver unit.

The second set of refrains is marked "Nombre premier en rythme non rétrogradable" (A prime number in non-retrogradable rhythm) and, like the first set of refrains with which they alternate, are expanded upon repetition—in this case by a series of progressively larger prime numbers: 41, 43, 47, and 53 semiquavers.

The strophes which occur between the refrains are marked "neumes rythmiques, avec résonances et intensités fixes" (rhythmic neumes, with fixed resonances and intensities). From his studies of the neumatic notation symbols of plainchant, Messiaen had formed the idea of exploring the rhythms corresponding to them. "In an interplay of transposition, the neumatic symbol as an indication of a sinuous melodic entity is now applied to a rhythmic motive. Each rhythmic neume is assigned a fixed dynamic and resonances of shimmering colours, more or less bright or somber, always contrasting."

The collage-like rhythmic structure grows from the iambic rhythm found at the beginning of the first strophe. As in the refrains, there is a process of augmentation upon repetition, in which new duration units are added in order to form more complex rhythmic cells. The pitches grow out of the major seventh and the tritone found at the beginning of the first strophe and in its third bar, respectively. Five basic dynamic-envelope patterns are applied to different groups, while at the same time the melodic motives constantly re-emerge in different rhythms.

=== IV. "Île de Feu II" ===
Although Messiaen's programme note for this étude says that it is, like the first étude, "also dedicated to Papua or New Guinea", his posthumously published analysis emphatically states that it refers only to the former, not the latter. "[T]he principal theme, ferocious and violent, has the same character as the themes of the first étude; the variations on this theme alternate with permutations, successively permuted according to the same process and superimposed two by two; the piece closes with a cross-handed perpetual motion in the depths of the keyboard".

The opening strophe from "Île de Feu I" is modified to become the cyclic theme of this étude. As in the other pieces, this alternates with episodes, in this case based on a mode of twelve durations, twelve sounds, four attacks and five intensities. The rhythmic focus in this piece concerns a symmetrical permutation scheme for a duration scale initially given in descending order of durations. The elements are reordered according to a wedge-shaped process, which Messiaen elsewhere called "permutation in the form of an open fan". The first permutation produces a new ordering which Messiaen called "Interversion I". The same permutation scheme applied to this first interversion produces "Interversion II", and so on:

"Île de Feu II": duration-row permutations
Initial series Interversion	12	11	10	9	8	7	6	5	4	3	2	1
I	6	7	5	8	4	9	3	10	2	11	1	12
II	3	9	10	4	2	8	11	5	1	7	12	6
III	11	8	5	2	1	4	7	10	12	9	6	3
IV	7	4	10	1	12	2	9	5	6	8	3	11
V	9	2	5	12	6	1	8	10	3	4	11	7
VI	8	1	10	6	3	12	4	5	11	2	7	9
VII	4	12	5	3	11	6	2	10	7	1	9	8
VIII	2	6	10	11	7	3	1	5	9	12	8	4
IX	1	3	5	7	9	11	12	10	8	6	4	2
X	12	11	10	9	8	7	6	5	4	3	2	1

A peculiarity is that the successive applications of this permutation do not yield the twelve permutations which might be expected. This is because the values 10 and 5 map into each other under this operation—which can be seen by scanning down columns 3 and 8 in the table. Consequently, the original order returns once the remaining ten values have circulated. This unexpected restriction has been cited as an example of what Messiaen called the "charm of impossibilities".

Messiaen later applied such permutation schemes in works of larger scale, such as the orchestral work Chronochromie, completed in 1960.

== Reception ==
The second of the études, "Mode de valeurs et d'intensités", overshadows all the others for having become the model for composers interested in the serialisation of musical parameters other than pitch. Initially, this influence occurred through works composed in 1950 and 1951 by two of Messiaen's pupils, Karel Goeyvaerts and Michel Fano. Messiaen's composition and one of the works inspired by it, Goeyvaerts's Sonata for Two Pianos, impressed Karlheinz Stockhausen at the Darmstädter Ferienkurse in 1951, prompting him to compose Kreuzspiel—his first acknowledged work. Pierre Boulez, after a period of estrangement from Messiaen caused by what Boulez viewed as the excessively sensual Turangalîla-Symphonie, belatedly discovered the "Mode de valeurs" in 1951 and composed his Structures, Book I as a gesture of conciliation to his former teacher, transforming the twelve "triplum" elements of the Mode's first division into ordered series and composed Structures 1a in a single night.

== Recordings ==
- Olivier Messiaen: Quatre Études de rythme. Olivier Messiaen, piano. Sound Recording 2 discs, 78 rpm, 30 cm. Columbia LFX 998/9 (CLX 2843; CLX 2844; CLX 2845; CLX 2846) [France]: Columbia, 1951. Presumably the same recording reissued in:
  - Les rarissimes de Olivier Messiaen. CD 1: Trois petites liturgies de la présence divine; Les offrandes oubliées; Vingt regards sur l'enfant Jésus; Trois préludes; CD 2: Visions de l'amen pour deux pianos; Quatre Études de rythme. Olivier Messiaen and Yvonne Loriod, piano; Jeanne Loriod, ondes Martenot; Ensemble Vocal Marcel Couraud; Orchestre de Chambre André Girard; Orchestre de l'Association des Concerts Pierné; Marcel Couraud and Roger Désormière, conds. Recorded: Paris, Théâtre Apollo und Studio Albert, between 1942 and 1954. Audio restoration by EMI Music France. Compact disc, 2 sound discs: monaural, 12 cm. EMI Classics 0946 385275 2 7. [France]: EMI Music France, 2007.
- Premier festival de l'art d'avant-garde. Anton Webern: Cinq Mélodies, op. 4; Variations pour piano, opus 27; Trois Chants, op. 23; Olivier Messiaen: Quatre Études de rythmes; Pierre Boulez: Étude II ("Etude sur sept sons"); Jean Barraqué: Étude. Ethel Semser, soprano; Paul Jacobs, piano. Musique sur bande. LP recording, 1 disc, 33 rpm, 30 cm. Barclay 89005. [N.p.]: Barclay Records, 1959.
- Olivier Messiaen: Huit préludes; Quatre Études de rythme. Yvonne Loriod, piano. LP recording, 1 disc, 33 rpm, stereo, 30 cm. Erato STU 70433. Paris: Éditions Costallat, 1968. Reissued as part of:
  - Messiaen: Petites esquisses d'oiseaux, Huit Préludes; Quatre Études de rythme. Yvonne Loriod, piano. Erato 2292-45505-2/5 ECD 71589 (+). Previously released in 1968 (2nd–3rd works) and in 1988; Yvonne Loriod, piano./ Recorded at the Eglise Notre-Dame du Liban, Paris, October 1987 (1st work) and January 1968 (2nd and 3rd works). Compact disc, 1 sound disc: digital; 12 cm. [Paris]: Erato, n.d.
  - Olivier Messiaen: Vingt regards sur l'Enfant Jésus; Petites esquisses d'oiseaux; Huit préludes; Quatre Études de rythme. Yvonne Loriod, piano. Recorded at the Eglise Notre-Dame du Liban, Paris, October 1973 (CD 1 & CD 2); October 1987 & October 1968 (CD 3). Compact disc, 3 sound discs: analog/digital, stereo, 12 cm. Series: Piano français. Erato 4509-96222-2. France: Erato, 1987.
- Piano Etudes by Bartók, Busoni, Messiaen, Stravinsky. Olivier Messiaen: Quatre etudes de rythme; Béla Bartók: Studies for Piano, op. 18; Ferruccio Benvenuto Busoni: Klavierübung (selections); Igor Fedorovich Stravinsky, Etudes for Piano, no. 7. Paul Jacobs, piano. LP recording, 1 disc: stereophonic. Nonesuch H-71334. Nonesuch Records, 1976. Reissued as part of The Legendary Busoni Recordings & Works by Bach, Bartók, Brahms, Messiaen, Stravinsky. Paul Jacobs, piano. Compact disc, 2 sound discs: digital, stereo, 12 cm. Arbiter 124. New York: Arbiter, 2000.
- Olivier Messiaen: Cantéyodjayâ; "Neumes rythmiques"; "Île de Feu" I and II. Robert Sherlaw Johnson: Piano Sonata No. 1; Seven Short Pieces. Robert Sherlaw Johnson, piano. LP recording, sound disc: analog, 33 1/3 rpm, stereo. Argo ZRG 694. London: Argo, 1972.
- Olivier Messiaen: Préludes & études. Michel Béroff, piano. LP recording, 1 disc, 33 rpm, 30 cm. La voix de son maître 2 C 06916229. France: Pathé Marconi, 1978.
- Iannis Xenakis: Evryali 1973; Herma: 1962; Olivier Messiaen: Quatre etudes de rythme. Yuji Takahashi, piano. Recorded at Arakawa Public Hall, Tokyo 21–22 May 1976. Compact disc, 1 sound disc: digital, stereo.; 4 3/4 in. Denon 33CO-1052. [Japan]: Denon, 1986.
- César Franck: Prélude, choral et fugue; Olivier Messiaen: Quatre études de rythme; Edvard Grieg: Sonata in E Minor, op. 7; Sergei Rachmaninov: Variations on a Theme by Arcangelo Corelli, op. 42. Shura Cherkassky, piano. Compact disc, sound disc, digital, stereo, 12 cm. Nimbus Records NI5090. Monmouth: Nimbus records Ltd., 1988.
- The Piano Music of Olivier Messiaen. Préludes; Quatre Études de rythme; Cantéyodjayâ . Peter Hill, piano. Previously released on analog discs in 1985 (1st work) and 1986 (remainder). Recorded in Rosslyn Hill Unitarian Chapel, 21–22 February 1984 and 25–26 September 1985. Compact disc, 1 sound disc: digital, stereo, 12 cm. London: Unicorn-Kanchana, 1989. Also packaged as part of Messiaen Edition vol. 1: Organ Works; Piano Works; Songs. Willem Tanke; Peter Hill, piano; Ingrid Kappelle; Håkon Austbø, piano. Compact disc, 17 sound discs: digital, stereo, 12 cm. Brilliant Classics 8949/1–17. [Leeuwarden, The Netherlands]: Brilliant Classics, 2008.
- Messiaen: Petites esquisses d’oiseaux; Cantéyodjayâ; Quatre eetudes de rhythme; Pièce pour le tombeau de Paul Dukas. Gloria Cheng, piano. Recorded 20–21 December 1993 at SUNY Purchase Recital Hall. Compact disc recording: digital, stereo, 12 cm. Koch International Classics 3-7267-2 H1. Port Washington, New York: Koch International L. P., 1994.
- Études pour piano, vol. 1: Strawinsky, Bartók, Messiaen, Ligeti. Igor Strawinsky: Quatre Études op. 7; Béla Bartók: Studies, op. 18; Olivier Messiaen: Quatre Études de rythme. György Ligeti: Etudes pour piano, premier livre et deuxième livre. Erika Haase, piano. Recorded Frankfurt am Main, Festeburgkirche, 1997. Compact disc, sound disc: digital, stereo, 12 cm. Tacet 53. [Germany]: Tacet, 1997.
- Olivier Messiaen: Piano Music. Håkon Austbø, piano. Vol. 3; Préludes [1–8]; Four rhythmic studies [Quatre Études de rythme]; Cantéyodjayâ.; Vol. 4; Les offrandes oubliées; Fantaisie burlesque; Pièce pour le tombeau de Paul Dukas; Rondeau; Prélude (1964); La fauvette des jardins. Compact disc, 4 sound discs Vol. 1– . [S.l.]: HNH International, 1999-
- Angela Hewitt Plays Olivier Messiaen. Préludes (selections): La colombe; Chant d'extase dans un paysage triste; Le nombre léger; Instants défunts; Les sons impalpables du rêve; Cloches d'angoisse et larmes d'adieu; Plainte calme; Un reflet dans le vent ...; Quatre études de rythme (selections): Île de Feu 1; Île de Feu 2; Vingt regards sur l'enfant Jésus (selections): Regard de la Vierge; Le baiser de l'Enfant-Jésus; Regard de l'esprit de joie. Angela Hewitt, piano. Recorded in the Reitstadel, Neumarkt in der Oberpfalz, Germany, 21–23 January 1998. Compact disc; 1 sound disc: digital, stereo, 12 cm. Hyperion CDA67054. London: Hyperion, 1998.
- Composizioni per pianoforte. Maurice Ravel: Le tombeau de Couperin; Claude Debussy: Cinq preludes; Jeux d'eau; Olivier Messiaen: Quatre Études de rythme. Luca Trabucco, pianist. Twentieth Century French Piano Music. Compact disc, 1 sound disc: stereo, digital, 12 cm. Sony PH 99504. [Austria]: Sony, 1999.
- Olivier Messiaen: Visions de l'amen; Quatre Études de rythme; Cantéyodjayâ. Paul Kim, piano; Matthew Kim, 2nd piano (in 1st work). Compact disc. Recorded in Armonk, New York, August 2002 (1st work) and in New York City, September 2002 (remaining works). Compact disc 1 sound disc: digital; 12 cm. Centaur Records CRC 2668. [Baton Rouge, La.]: Centaur Records, 2003.
- Olivier Messiaen: Préludes; Quatre Études de rythme; Cantéyodjayâ. Martin Zehn, piano. Recorded in Cologne (Klaus-von-Bismarck-Saal). Compact disc 1 sound disc: digital, stereo, 12 cm. Arte Nova 82876 57833 2; [Europe]: BMG; [France]: distrib. BMG, 2004
- Hommage à Messiaen. Pierre-Laurent Aimard, piano. Compact disc, sound disc: digital, stereo, 12 cm. Deutsche Grammophon 477 7452 GH. Contents: Préludes pour piano (selection): "La bouscarle"; Catalogue d'oiseaux (selection): "L'alouette Lulu"; Quatre Études de rythme (selections): "Île de Feu 1 et 2". Hamburg: Deutsche Grammophon, 2008.
- Olivier Messiaen, 1908–1992. The Anniversary Edition, vol. 7. Visions de l'amen; Quatre Études de rythme; Cantéyodjayâ. In the 1st work: Alexandre Rabinovitch, Martha Argerich, pianos; 2nd work: Michel Béroff, piano; 3rd work: John Ogdon, piano. 1 sound disc: digital, 12 cm. EMI Classics 2174732. 2008
- Complete edition. Olivier Messiaen; Roger Muraro; Olivier Latry. Compact disc 32 sound discs: digital; 12 cm. Deutsche Grammophon (set) 480 1333; Deutsche Grammophon 480 1365-480 1334. CD 2: Petites esquisses d'oiseaux; Quatre Études de rythme; Cantéyodjayâ; Rondeau; Fantasie burlesque; Prélude pour piano; Piéce pour le tombeau de Paul Dukas. Roger Muraro, piano. Germany: Deutsche Grammophon, 2008.
