= Gerig (music publishers) =

Gerig, also known as Hans Gerig Verlag, was a German firm of music publishers. It was founded as the Bühnen- und Musikverlag Hans Gerig in the city of Cologne in 1946 by Hans Gerig (1910–1978). Over time, the firm grew to include a total of 36 different publishing houses: including the subsidiaries: Sidemton, Mondial, Rialto, Excelsior and Volk. In ceased to exist after being acquired by ROBA Music Publishing in 2022. At the time of its acquisition, the Gerig firm was described as "Germany's leading music publisher"; a position if had held for decades. Its catalogue at the time of purchase included more than 30,000 songs and the master rights to thousands of works.
