= Serialism =

Musical method or technique of composition

Six-element row of rhythmic values used in Variazioni canoniche by Luigi Nono.

In music, serialism is a method of composition using series of pitches, rhythms, dynamics, timbres or other musical elements. Serialism began primarily with Arnold Schoenberg's twelve-tone technique, though some of his contemporaries were also working to establish serialism as a form of post-tonal thinking. Twelve-tone technique orders the twelve notes of the chromatic scale, forming a row or series and providing a unifying basis for a composition's melody, harmony, structural progressions, and variations. Other types of serialism also work with sets, collections of objects, but not necessarily with fixed-order series, and extend the technique to other musical dimensions (often called "parameters"), such as duration, dynamics, and timbre.

The idea of serialism is also applied in various ways in the visual arts, design, and architecture, and the musical concept has also been adapted in literature.

Integral serialism or total serialism is the use of series for aspects such as duration, dynamics, and register as well as pitch. Other terms, used especially in Europe to distinguish post-World War II serial music from twelve-tone music and its American extensions, are general serialism and multiple serialism.

Composers such as Arnold Schoenberg, Anton Webern, Alban Berg, Karlheinz Stockhausen, Pierre Boulez, Luigi Nono, Milton Babbitt, Elisabeth Lutyens, Henri Pousseur, Charles Wuorinen and Jean Barraqué used serial techniques of one sort or another in most of their music. Other composers such as Tadeusz Baird, Béla Bartók, Luciano Berio, Bruno Maderna, Franco Donatoni, Benjamin Britten, John Cage, Aaron Copland, Ernst Krenek, György Ligeti, Olivier Messiaen, Arvo Pärt, Walter Piston, Ned Rorem, Alfred Schnittke, Ruth Crawford Seeger, Dmitri Shostakovich, and Igor Stravinsky used serialism only in some of their compositions or only in some sections of pieces, as did some jazz composers, such as Bill Evans, Yusef Lateef, Bill Smith, and even rock musicians like Frank Zappa.

== Basic definitions ==
Serialism is a method, "highly specialized technique", or "way" of composition. It may also be considered "a philosophy of life (Weltanschauung), a way of relating the human mind to the world and creating a completeness when dealing with a subject".

Serialism is not by itself a system of composition or a style. Neither is pitch serialism necessarily incompatible with tonality, though it is most often used as a means of composing atonal music.

"Serial music" is a problematic term because it is used differently in different languages and especially because, shortly after its coinage in French, it underwent essential alterations during its transmission to German. The term's use in connection with music was first introduced in French by René Leibowitz in 1947, and immediately afterward by Humphrey Searle in English, as an alternative translation of the German Zwölftontechnik (twelve-tone technique) or Reihenmusik (row music); it was independently introduced by Stockhausen and Herbert Eimert into German in 1955 as serielle Musik, with a different meaning, but also translated as "serial music".

=== Twelve-tone serialism ===
Serialism of the first type is most specifically defined as a structural principle according to which a recurring series of ordered elements (normally a set—or row—of pitches or pitch classes) is used in order or manipulated in particular ways to give a piece unity. "Serial" is often broadly used to describe all music written in what Schoenberg called "The Method of Composing with Twelve Notes related only to one another", or dodecaphony, and methods that evolved from his methods. It is sometimes used more specifically to apply only to music in which at least one element other than pitch is treated as a row or series. Such methods are often called post-Webernian serialism. Other terms used to make the distinction are twelve-note serialism for the former and integral serialism for the latter.

A row may be assembled pre-compositionally (perhaps to embody particular intervallic or symmetrical properties), or derived from a spontaneously invented thematic or motivic idea. The row's structure does not in itself define the structure of a composition, which requires development of a comprehensive strategy. The choice of strategy often depends on the relationships contained in a row class, and rows may be constructed with an eye to producing the relationships needed to form desired strategies.

The basic set may have additional restrictions, such as the requirement that it use each interval only once.

=== Non-twelve-tone serialism ===
The series is not an order of succession, but indeed a hierarchy—which may be independent of this order of succession. — Pierre Boulez, "...Auprès et au loin",

Rules of analysis derived from twelve-tone theory do not apply to serialism of the second type: "in particular the ideas, one, that the series is an intervallic sequence, and two, that the rules are consistent". For example, Stockhausen's early serial works, such as Kreuzspiel and Formel, "advance in unit sections within which a preordained set of pitches is repeatedly reconfigured ... The composer's model for the distributive serial process corresponds to a development of the Zwölftonspiel of Josef Matthias Hauer". Goeyvaerts's Nummer 4

provides a classic illustration of the distributive function of seriality: 4 times an equal number of elements of equal duration within an equal global time is distributed in the most equable way, unequally with regard to one another, over the temporal space: from the greatest possible coïncidence to the greatest possible dispersion. This provides an exemplary demonstration of that logical principle of seriality: every situation must occur once and only once.

Henri Pousseur, after initially working with twelve-tone technique in works like Sept Versets (1950) and Trois Chants sacrés (1951),

evolved away from this bond in Symphonies pour quinze Solistes [1954–55] and in the Quintette [à la mémoire d’Anton Webern, 1955], and from around the time of Impromptu [1955] encounters whole new dimensions of application and new functions.

The twelve-tone series loses its imperative function as a prohibiting, regulating, and patterning authority; its working-out is abandoned through its own constant-frequent presence: all 66 intervallic relations among the 12 pitches being virtually present. Prohibited intervals, like the octave, and prohibited successional relations, such as premature note repetitions, frequently occur, although obscured in the dense contexture. The number twelve no longer plays any governing, defining rôle; the pitch constellations no longer hold to the limitation determined by their formation. The dodecaphonic series loses its significance as a concrete model of shape (or a well-defined collection of concrete shapes) is played out. And the chromatic total remains active only, and provisionally, as a general reference.

In the 1960s Pousseur took this a step further, applying a consistent set of predefined transformations to preexisting music. One example is the large orchestral work Couleurs croisées (Crossed Colours, 1967), which performs these transformations on the protest song "We Shall Overcome", creating a succession of different situations that are sometimes chromatic and dissonant and sometimes diatonic and consonant. In his opera Votre Faust (Your Faust, 1960–68) Pousseur used many quotations, themselves arranged into a "scale" for serial treatment. This "generalised" serialism (in the strongest possible sense) aims not to exclude any musical phenomena, no matter how heterogeneous, in order "to control the effects of tonal determinism, dialectize its causal functions, and overcome any academic prohibitions, especially the fixing of an anti-grammar meant to replace some previous one".

At about the same time, Stockhausen began using serial methods to integrate a variety of musical sources from recorded examples of folk and traditional music from around the world in his electronic composition Telemusik (1966), and from national anthems in Hymnen (1966–67). He extended this serial "polyphony of styles" in a series of "process-plan" works in the late 1960s, as well as later in portions of Licht, the cycle of seven operas he composed between 1977 and 2003.

== History of serial music ==
=== Before World War II ===
In the late 19th and early 20th century, composers began to struggle against the ordered system of chords and intervals known as "functional tonality". Composers such as Debussy and Strauss found ways to stretch the limits of the tonal system to accommodate their ideas. After a brief period of free atonality, Schoenberg and others began exploring tone rows, in which an ordering of the 12 pitches of the equal-tempered chromatic scale is used as the source material of a composition. This ordered set, often called a row, allowed for new forms of expression and (unlike free atonality) the expansion of underlying structural organizing principles without recourse to common practice harmony.

Twelve-tone serialism first appeared in the 1920s, with antecedents predating that decade (instances of 12-note passages occur in Liszt's Faust Symphony and in Bach.) Schoenberg was the composer most decisively involved in devising and demonstrating the fundamentals of twelve-tone serialism, though it is clear it is not the work of just one musician. In Schoenberg's own words, his goal of l'invention contrariée was to show constraint in composition. Consequently, some reviewers have jumped to the conclusion that serialism acted as a predetermined method of composing to avoid the subjectivity and ego of a composer in favor of calculated measure and proportion. In the 1930s, serial composers such as Schoenberg, Krenek, Wolpe, and Eisler left Europe for the U.S. to escape World War II. This sparked a change in American music as well as the works of the European composers now residing in the U.S.

=== After World War II ===
Along with John Cage's indeterminate music (music composed with the use of chance operations) and Werner Meyer-Eppler's aleatoricism, serialism was enormously influential in postwar music. Theorists such as Milton Babbitt and George Perle codified serial systems, leading to a mode of composition called "total serialism", in which every aspect of a piece, not just pitch, is serially constructed. Perle's 1962 text Serial Composition and Atonality became a standard work on the origins of serial composition in the music of Schoenberg, Berg, and Webern.

The serialization of rhythm, dynamics, and other elements of music was partly fostered by the work of Olivier Messiaen and his analysis students, including Karel Goeyvaerts and Boulez, in postwar Paris. Messiaen first used a chromatic rhythm scale in his Vingt Regards sur l'enfant-Jésus (1944), but he did not employ a rhythmic series until 1946–48, in the seventh movement, "Turangalîla II", of his Turangalîla-Symphonie. The first examples of such integral serialism are Babbitt's Three Compositions for Piano (1947), Composition for Four Instruments (1948), and Composition for Twelve Instruments (1948). He worked independently of the Europeans.

Olivier Messiaen's unordered series for pitch, duration, dynamics, and articulation from the pre-serial Mode de valeurs et d'intensités, upper division only—which Pierre Boulez adapted as an ordered row for his Structures I.

Several of the composers associated with Darmstadt, notably Stockhausen, Goeyvaerts, and Pousseur, developed a form of serialism that initially rejected the recurring rows characteristic of twelve-tone technique in order to eradicate any lingering traces of thematicism. Instead of a recurring, referential row, "each musical component is subjected to control by a series of numerical proportions". In Europe, some serial and non-serial music of the early 1950s emphasized the determination of all parameters for each note independently, often resulting in widely spaced, isolated "points" of sound, an effect called first in German "punktuelle Musik" ("pointist" or "punctual music"), then in French "musique ponctuelle", but quickly confused with "pointillistic" (German "pointillistische", French "pointilliste"), the term associated with the densely packed dots in Seurat's paintings, even though the concept was unrelated.

Pieces were structured by closed sets of proportions, a method closely related to certain works from the de Stijl and Bauhaus movements in design and architecture some writers called "serial art", specifically the paintings of Piet Mondrian, Theo van Doesburg, Bart van Leck, Georg van Tongerloo, Richard Paul Lohse, and Burgoyne Diller, who had sought to "avoid repetition and symmetry on all structural levels and working with a limited number of elements".

Stockhausen described the final synthesis in this manner:

So serial thinking is something that's come into our consciousness and will be there forever: it's relativity and nothing else. It just says: Use all the components of any given number of elements, don't leave out individual elements, use them all with equal importance and try to find an equidistant scale so that certain steps are no larger than others. It's a spiritual and democratic attitude toward the world. The stars are organized in a serial way. Whenever you look at a certain star sign you find a limited number of elements with different intervals. If we more thoroughly studied the distances and proportions of the stars we'd probably find certain relationships of multiples based on some logarithmic scale or whatever the scale may be.

Stravinsky's adoption of twelve-tone serial techniques shows the level of influence serialism had after the Second World War. Previously Stravinsky had used series of notes without rhythmic or harmonic implications. Because many of the basic techniques of serial composition have analogs in traditional counterpoint, uses of inversion, retrograde, and retrograde inversion from before the war do not necessarily indicate Stravinsky was adopting Schoenbergian techniques. But after meeting Robert Craft and other younger composers, Stravinsky began to study Schoenberg's music, as well as that of Webern and later composers, and to adapt their techniques in his work, using, for example, serial techniques applied to fewer than twelve notes. During the 1950s he used procedures related to Messiaen, Webern and Berg. While it is inaccurate to call them all "serial" in the strict sense, all his major works of the period have clear serialist elements.

During this period, the concept of serialism influenced not only new compositions but also scholarly analysis of the classical masters. Adding to their professional tools of sonata form and tonality, scholars began to analyze previous works in the light of serial techniques; for example, they found the use of row technique in previous composers going back to Mozart and Beethoven. In particular, the orchestral outburst that introduces the development section halfway through the last movement of Mozart's Symphony No. 40 is a tone row that Mozart punctuates in a very modern and violent way that Michael Steinberg called "rude octaves and frozen silences".

Ruth Crawford Seeger extended serial control to parameters other than pitch and to formal planning as early as 1930–33 in a fashion that goes beyond Webern but was less thoroughgoing than the later practices of Babbitt and European postwar composers. Charles Ives's 1906 song "The Cage" begins with piano chords presented in incrementally decreasing durations, an early example of an overtly arithmetic duration series independent of meter (like Nono's six-element row shown above), and in that sense a precursor to Messiaen's style of integral serialism. The idea of organizing pitch and rhythm according to similar or related principles is also suggested by both Henry Cowell's New Musical Resources (1930) and the work of Joseph Schillinger.

== Reactions to serialism ==
the first time I ever heard Webern in a concert performance …[t]he impression it made on me was the same as I was to experience a few years later when … I first laid eyes on a Mondriaan canvas...: those things, of which I had acquired an extremely intimate knowledge, came across as crude and unfinished when seen in reality.

— Karel Goeyvaerts on Anton Webern's music.

Some music theorists have criticized serialism on the basis that its compositional strategies are often incompatible with the way the human mind processes a piece of music. Nicolas Ruwet (1959) was one of the first to criticise serialism by a comparison with linguistic structures, citing theoretical claims by Boulez and Pousseur, taking as specific examples bars from Stockhausen's Klavierstücke I & II, and calling for a general reexamination of Webern's music. Ruwet specifically names three works as exempt from his criticism: Stockhausen's Zeitmaße and Gruppen, and Boulez's Le marteau sans maître.

In response, Pousseur questioned Ruwet's equivalence between phonemes and notes. He also suggested that, if analysis of Le marteau sans maître and Zeitmaße, "performed with sufficient insight", were to be made from the point of view of wave theory—taking into account the dynamic interaction of the different component phenomena, which creates "waves" that interact in a sort of frequency modulation—the analysis "would accurately reflect the realities of perception". This was because these composers had long since acknowledged the lack of differentiation found in punctual music and, becoming increasingly aware of the laws of perception and complying better with them, "paved the way to a more effective kind of musical communication, without in the least abandoning the emancipation that they had been allowed to achieve by this 'zero state' that was punctual music". One way this was achieved was by developing the concept of "groups", which allows structural relationships to be defined not only between individual notes but also at higher levels, up to the overall form of a piece. This is "a structural method par excellence", and a sufficiently simple conception that it remains easily perceptible. Pousseur also points out that serial composers were the first to recognize and attempt to move beyond the lack of differentiation within certain pointillist works. Pousseur later followed up on his own suggestion by developing his idea of "wave" analysis and applying it to Stockhausen's Zeitmaße in two essays.

Later writers have continued both lines of reasoning. Fred Lerdahl, for example, in his essay "Cognitive Constraints on Compositional Systems", argues that serialism's perceptual opacity ensures its aesthetic inferiority. Lerdahl has in turn been criticized for excluding "the possibility of other, non-hierarchical methods of achieving musical coherence," and for concentrating on the audibility of tone rows, and the portion of his essay focusing on Boulez's "multiplication" technique (exemplified in three movements of Le Marteau sans maître) has been challenged on perceptual grounds by Stephen Heinemann and Ulrich Mosch. Ruwet's critique has also been criticised for making "the fatal mistake of equating visual presentation (a score) with auditive presentation (the music as heard)".

In all these reactions discussed above, the "information extracted", "perceptual opacity", "auditive presentation" (and constraints thereof) pertain to what defines serialism, namely use of a series. And since Schoenberg remarked, "in the later part of a work, when the set [series] had already become familiar to the ear", it has been assumed that serial composers expect their series to be aurally perceived. This principle even became the premise of empirical investigation in the guise of "probe-tone" experiments testing listeners' familiarity with a row after exposure to its various forms (as would occur in a 12-tone work). In other words the supposition in critiques of serialism has been that, if a composition is so intricately structured by and around a series, that series should ultimately be clearly perceived or that a listener ought to become aware of its presence or importance. Babbitt denied this:

That's not the way I conceive of a set [series]. This is not a matter of finding the lost [series]. This is not a matter of cryptoanalysis (where's the hidden [series]?). What I'm interested in is the effect it might have, the way it might assert itself not necessarily explicitly.

Seemingly in accord with Babbitt's statement, but ranging over such issues as perception, aesthetic value, and the "poietic fallacy", Walter Horn offers a more extensive explanation of the serialism (and atonality) controversy.

Within the community of modern music, exactly what constituted serialism was also a matter of debate. The conventional English usage is that the word "serial" applies to all twelve-tone music, which is a subset of serial music, and it is this usage that is generally intended in reference works. Nevertheless, a large body of music exists that is called "serial" but does not employ note-rows at all, let alone twelve-tone technique, e.g., Stockhausen's Klavierstücke I–IV (which use permuted sets), his Stimmung (with pitches from the overtone series, which is also used as the model for the rhythms), and Pousseur's Scambi (where the permuted sounds are made exclusively from filtered white noise).

When serialism is not limited to twelve-tone techniques, a contributing problem is that the word "serial" is seldom if ever defined. In many published analyses of individual pieces the term is used while actual meaning is skated around.

== Theory of twelve-tone serial music ==
Due to Babbitt's work, in the mid-20th century serialist thought became rooted in set theory and began to use a quasi-mathematical vocabulary for the manipulation of the basic sets. Musical set theory is often used to analyze and compose serial music, and is also sometimes used in tonal and nonserial atonal analysis.

The basis for serial composition is Schoenberg's twelve-tone technique, where the 12 notes of the chromatic scale are organized into a row. This "basic" row is then used to create permutations, that is, rows derived from the basic set by reordering its elements. The row may be used to produce a set of intervals, or a composer may derive the row from a particular succession of intervals. A row that uses all of the intervals in their ascending form once is an all-interval row. In addition to permutations, the basic row may have some set of notes derived from it, which is used to create a new row. These are derived sets.

Because there are tonal chord progressions that use all twelve notes, it is possible to create pitch rows with very strong tonal implications, and even to write tonal music using twelve-tone technique. Most tone rows contain subsets that can imply a pitch center; a composer can create music centered on one or more of the row's constituent pitches by emphasizing or avoiding these subsets, respectively, as well as through other, more complex compositional devices.

To serialize other elements of music, a system quantifying an identifiable element must be created or defined (this is called "parametrization", after the term in mathematics). For example, if duration is serialized, a set of durations must be specified; if tone colour (timbre) is serialized, a set of separate tone colours must be identified; and so on.

The selected set or sets, their permutations and derived sets form the composer's basic material.

Composition using twelve-tone serial methods focuses on each appearance of the collection of twelve chromatic notes, called an aggregate. (Sets of more or fewer pitches, or of elements other than pitch, may be treated analogously.) One principle operative in some serial compositions is that no element of the aggregate should be reused in the same contrapuntal strand (statement of a series) until all the other members have been used, and each member must appear only in its place in the series. Yet, since most serial compositions have multiple (at least two, sometimes as many as a few dozen) series statements occurring concurrently, interwoven with each other in time, and feature repetitions of some of their pitches, this principle as stated is more a referential abstraction than a description of the concrete reality of a musical work that is termed "serial".

A series may be divided into subsets, and the members of the aggregate not part of a subset are said to be its complement. A subset is self-complementing if it contains half of the set and its complement is also a permutation of the original subset. This is most commonly seen with hexachords, six-note segments of a tone row. A hexachord that is self-complementing for a particular permutation is called prime combinatorial. A hexachord that is self-complementing for all the canonic operations—inversion, retrograde, and retrograde inversion—is called all-combinatorial.

== Notable composers ==
- Hans Abrahamsen
- Gilbert Amy
- Louis Andriessen
- Denis ApIvor
- Hans Erich Apostel
- Kees van Baaren
- Milton Babbitt
- Tadeusz Baird
- Osvaldas Balakauskas
- Don Banks
- Jean Barraqué
- Jürg Baur
- Alban Berg
- Gunnar Berg
- Arthur Berger
- Erik Bergman
- Luciano Berio
- Karl-Birger Blomdahl
- Konrad Boehmer
- Rob du Bois
- André Boucourechliev
- Pierre Boulez
- Martin Boykan
- Ole Buck
- Jacques Calonne
- Niccolò Castiglioni
- Aldo Clementi
- Salvador Contreras
- Aaron Copland
- Luigi Dallapiccola
- Franco Donatoni
- Hanns Eisler
- Manuel Enríquez
- Karlheinz Essl
- Franco Evangelisti
- Brian Ferneyhough
- Jacobo Ficher
- Irving Fine
- Wolfgang Fortner
- Benjamin Frankel
- Roberto Gerhard
- Frans Geysen
- Michael Gielen
- Alberto Ginastera
- Lucien Goethals
- Karel Goeyvaerts
- Jerry Goldsmith
- Henryk Górecki
- Glenn Gould
- Pelle Gudmundsen-Holmgreen
- César Guerra-Peixe
- Lou Harrison
- Jonathan Harvey
- Josef Matthias Hauer
- Paavo Heininen
- Hermann Heiss
- Hans Werner Henze
- York Höller
- Heinz Holliger
- Bill Hopkins
- Klaus Huber
- Karel Husa
- Hanns Jelinek
- Ben Johnston
- Nikolai Karetnikov
- Rudolf Kelterborn
- Gottfried Michael Koenig
- Józef Koffler
- Ernst Krenek
- Meyer Kupferman
- René Leibowitz
- Ingvar Lidholm
- Witold Lutosławski
- Elisabeth Lutyens
- John McGuire
- Bruno Maderna
- Ursula Mamlok
- Philippe Manoury
- Donald Martino
- Paul Méfano
- Jacques-Louis Monod
- Robert Morris
- Luigi Nono
- Per Nørgård
- Krzysztof Penderecki
- Goffredo Petrassi
- Michel Philippot
- Walter Piston
- Henri Pousseur
- Einojuhani Rautavaara
- Roger Reynolds
- Terry Riley
- George Rochberg
- Leonard Rosenman
- Cláudio Santoro
- Peter Schat
- Leon Schidlowsky
- Dieter Schnebel
- Arnold Schoenberg, considered the founder of serialism
- Humphrey Searle
- Ruth Crawford Seeger
- Mátyás Seiber
- Roger Sessions
- Nikos Skalkottas
- Roger Smalley
- Ann Southam
- Leopold Spinner
- Karlheinz Stockhausen
- Igor Stravinsky
- Robert Suderburg
- Richard Swift
- Louise Talma
- Camillo Togni
- Gilles Tremblay
- Fartein Valen
- Wladimir Vogel
- Anton Webern
- Hugo Weisgall
- Peter Westergaard
- Stefan Wolpe
- Charles Wuorinen
- La Monte Young

== See also ==
- Pitch interval
