= Structures (Boulez) =

Compositions by Pierre Boulez

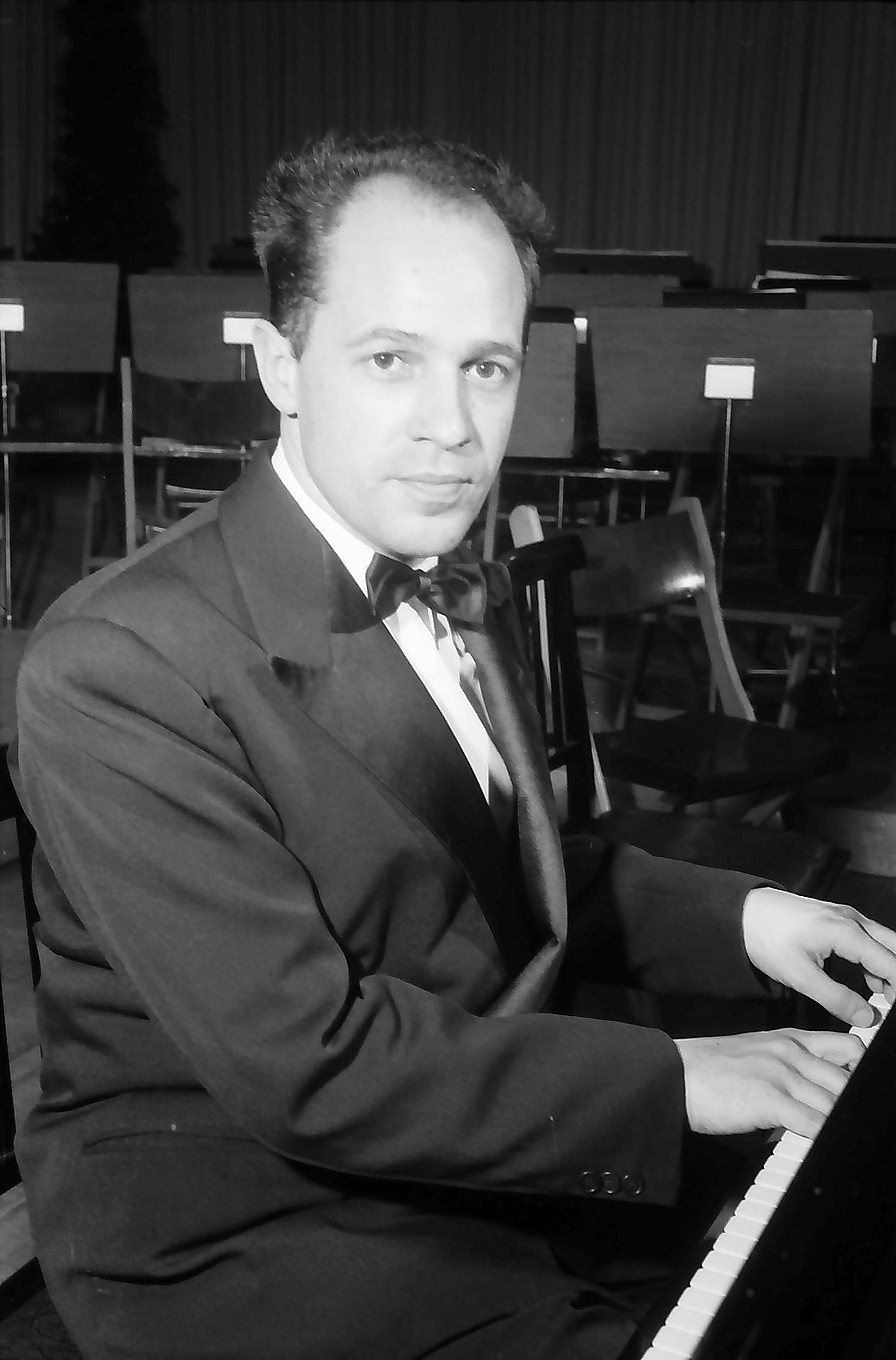
Pierre Boulez in 1956

Structures I (1952) and Structures II (1961) are two related works for two pianos, composed by the French composer Pierre Boulez.

== History ==
The first book of Structures was begun in early 1951, as Boulez was completing his orchestral work Polyphonie X, and finished in 1952. It consists of three movements, or "chapters", labelled Ia, Ib, and Ic, composed in the order a, c, b. The first of the second book's two "chapters" was composed in 1956, but chapter 2 was not written until 1961. The second chapter includes three sets of variable elements, which are to be arranged to make a performing version. A partial premiere of book 2 was performed by the composer and Yvonne Loriod at the Wigmore Hall, London, in March 1957. This was Boulez's first appearance in the UK as a performer. The same performers gave the premiere of the complete second book, with two different versions of chapter 2, in a chamber-music concert of the Donaueschinger Musiktage on Saturday, 21 October 1961.

Olivier Messiaen's Mode de valeurs et d'intensités highest of three unordered divisions of the mode,( or, less precisely, "three series forms [caption: 'for pitch, duration, dynamics, and articulation']...treated as unordered collections",—which Boulez, "the pupil intending to teach the master a lesson", adapted as an ordered series for his Structures Ia.

Structures I was the last and most successful of Boulez's works to use the technique of integral serialism, wherein many parameters of a piece's construction are governed by serial principles, rather than only pitch. Boulez devised scales of twelve dynamic levels (though in a later revision of the score these reduced to ten), twelve durations, and—from the outset—ten modes of attack, each to be used in a manner analogous to a twelve-tone row. The composer explains his purpose in this work:

I wanted to eradicate from my vocabulary absolutely every trace of the conventional, whether it concerned figures and phrases, or development and form; I then wanted gradually, element after element, to win back the various stages of the compositional process, in such a manner that a perfectly new synthesis might arise, a synthesis that would not be corrupted from the very outset by foreign bodies—stylistic reminiscences in particular.

== Discography ==
=== Book 1 ===
- Aloys and Alfons Kontarsky, 1960, Domaine musical
- Aloys and Alfons Kontarsky, 1965, Ariola Tonstudio, Cologne, WERGO
- Pi-Hsien Chen and Ian Pace, 2–5 October 2007, WDR Funkhaus, Klaus-von-Bismarck Saal, Hat-Hut
- Michael Wendeberg and Nicolas Hodges, 2019, Pierre Boulez Saal, Berlin, bastille musique

=== Book 2 ===
- Pierre Boulez and Yvonne Loriod, 20–21 October 1961, Hans-Rosbaud Studio, Baden.-Baden. 75 Jahre Donaueschinger Musiktage 1921–1996. 12-CD set, mono & stereo. Col Legno Contemporary WWE 12CD 31899. [Munich]: Col Legno Musikproduktion GmbH, 1996. CD 10, Col Legno Contemporary WWE 1CD 31909, includes the world-premiere performance of Structures pour deux pianos, deuxième livre, played by Yvonne Loriod and Pierre Boulez.
- Aloys and Alfons Kontarsky, 1965, Ariola Tonstudio, Cologne, WERGO
- Bernhard Wambach and Pi-Hsin Chen, 30 March 1985, Weinbrenner-Saal des Kurhauses, Baden-Baden, Sony
- Florent Boffard and Pierre-Laurent Aimard, October 1994, ESPRO, IRCAM, Deutsche Grammophon
- Pi-Hsien Chen and Ian Pace, 2–5 October 2007, WDR Funkhaus, Klaus-von-Bismarck Saal, Hat-Hut
- Michael Wendeberg and Nicolas Hodges, 2019, Pierre Boulez Saal, Berlin, bastille musique

== See also ==
- Time point
