= Peter Westergaard =

American composer and music theorist (1931–2019)

Peter Talbot Westergaard (28 May 1931 – 26 June 2019) was an American composer and music theorist. He was Professor Emeritus of music at Princeton University.

== Biography ==
Westergaard was born on 28 May 1931 in Champaign, Illinois. He pursued undergraduate studies at Harvard University, graduating in 1953, and in 1956 obtained an M.F.A. degree from Princeton University. He studied with Roger Sessions, Walter Piston, Darius Milhaud, Edward Cone, Milton Babbitt and Wolfgang Fortner (Pratt 2001) in Freiburg/Germany.

He taught at Columbia University, Amherst College, and Princeton University before retiring in 2001. He continued to be active as a composer, mainly of opera and chamber music. He died in June 2019 at the age of 88.

== Composer and theorist ==
Amongst former pupils of Babbitt, Westergaard stands out for his contributions to serial theory, as well as for his compositions, which are characterized by a delight in symmetry and mirror relationships, together with a concern for the systematic and integrated use of all the parameters of music, producing multileveled, clear, beautiful, and audible patterns.

== Music ==
=== Operas ===
- Charivari (1953)
- Mr. and Mrs. Discobbolos (1966)
- The Tempest (1994)
- Chicken-Little (1997)
- Moby Dick: Scenes from an Imaginary Opera (2004)
- Alice in Wonderland (2006)

Film version of Alice in Wonderland published by Albany records.

=== Vocal music ===
- Cantata I: "The Plot Against the Giant" (text: W. Stevens), for female voices, clarinet, harp, and cello (1956)
- Cantata II: "A Refusal to Mourn the Death, by Fire, of a Child in London" (text: Dylan Thomas), for bass and ten instruments (1958)
- Cantata III: "Leda and the Swan" (text: William Butler Yeats), for mezzo-soprano, clarinet, viola, vibraphone, and marimba (1961)
- Cantata IV: "Spring and Fall: To a Young Child" (text: Gerard Manley Hopkins), for soprano and five instruments (1964)
- There Was a Little Man for soprano and violin (1979)
- Ariel Music (text: William Shakespeare, from The Tempest), for soprano and ten instruments (1987)
- Ode (text: Ben Jonson), for soprano, flute, clarinet, harp, violin, and viola (1989)
- anyone lived in a pretty how town (text: E. E. Cummings), for SATB choir (1997)
- Cantata V: "'Byzantium' and 'Sailing to Byzantium'" (text: William Butler Yeats), for baritone and percussion quartet (1997)
- There Was a Lady Loved a Sow (text: traditional) (1997)
- Cantata VI: "To the Dark Lady" (text: William Shakespeare), for soprano, mezzo-soprano, tenor, baritone, and percussion duo (1999)

=== Instrumental music ===
- String Quartet, 1957;
- Five Movements, for small orchestra (1958)
- Quartet, for clarinet, vibraphone, violin, and cello (1960)
- Trio, for flute, cello, and piano (1962)
- Variations for Six Players, for flute, clarinet, piano, percussion, violin, and cello (1963)
- Divertimento on Discobbolic Fragments, for flute and piano (1967)
- Noises, Sounds, and Sweet Airs, for ensemble (1968)
- Tuckets and Sennets (Anon. n.d.), for band (1969)
- Moto perpetuo, for flute, oboe, clarinet, bassoon, trumpet, and horn (1976)
- Two Fanfares, for brass (1988)
- Ringing Changes, for orchestra (1996)
- All Fours, for percussion quartet (1997)

== Writings ==
- Westergaard, Peter (1975). An Introduction to Tonal Theory. New York: W. W. Norton & Company. ISBN 0-393-09342-5.

== Sources ==
- Anon. (n.d.). "Sennet (senet, sonnet, sennit, sennate, sinet, synnet, cynet)". Oxford Music Online. doi:10.1093/gmo/9781561592630.article.25415. ISBN 978-1-56159-263-0.
- Griffiths, Paul. 1981. Modern Music: The Avant Garde since 1945. New York: George Braziller. ISBN 0-8076-1018-6.
- Pratt, Michael J. 2001. "Westergaard, Peter (Talbot)". The New Grove Dictionary of Music and Musicians, second edition, edited by Stanley Sadie and John Tyrrell. London: Macmillan Publishers.
