= Carl Friedrich Weitzmann =

German music theorist and musician

Carl Friedrich Weitzmann (10 August 1808 – 7 November 1880) was a German music theorist and musician.

== Life and work ==
Weitzmann was born in Berlin and first studied violin in the 1820s with Carl Henning and Bernhard Klein. From 1827 to 1832, he studied composition in Kassel with Louis Spohr and Moritz Hauptmann. In 1832, he founded a Liedertafel (a peculiarly German type of male singing society) in Riga (now in Latvia) with Heinrich Dorn. In Revel (now Tallinn, Estonia), he became music director of the opera, where he composed three operas. From 1836, he began a ten-year association with the Saint Petersburg court orchestra. At this time, he began to collect music books and folksongs. Weitzmann toured Lappland and Finland (then part of the Russian Empire) and performed with orchestras in Paris and London returning to Berlin in 1848 to research music history and theory. In 1857, he took a teaching position with the Stern Conservatory (now part of the Berlin University of the Arts).

Weitzmann published his first major theoretical work, Der übermässige Dreiklang (The Augmented Triad) in 1853. In this treatise, he suggested that the minor triad was merely an inversion of the major triad and that both are generated by a common fundamental tone in the middle. Weitzmann's demonstration of the efficacy of each of the four possible perfectly even augmented triads in resolving to six major and minor triads-each using single- or double-semitone displacement, has been a significant influence on modern neo-Riemannian theorists. During Weitzmann's own lifetime, composer Franz Liszt showed considerable interest in new theories regarding dissonant sonorities, referencing Weitzmann's "Der übermässige Dreiklang" in an analysis of his own Faust Symphony (a composition famously saturated with augmented triads). This has led to a strong conceptual association between Weitzmann's work and the Zukunftsmusik ("Music of the Future") which he sought to explain and justify.

Weitzmann later extended his theories to scales, noting how a descending minor scale starting from the fifth degree is an inversion of an ascending major scale. Because his theories relate major and minor, it is called a "dualist" explanation. Later dualist theorists include Arthur von Oettingen and the early work of Hugo Riemann.

Weitzmann differed from most theorists in his ideas of tuning and temperament. Most theorists viewed equal temperament as a compromise or a necessary evil. Weitzmann viewed it positively. He looked for acoustical properties of 12-note equal temperament, presumed enharmonic equivalence, and de-emphasized traditional rules of voice leading and treatment of dissonance, leading to a theory where any chord can follow another chord.

His most lasting contribution to music theory (researched by contemporary American theorist Richard Cohn) concerns chord relations. Traditionally, a C-major triad was thought to be related most closely to a G-major triad through the circle of fifths and traditional tonic-dominant (V-I) resolution. Weitzmann suggested a-minor and e-minor triads were more closely related to C-major because they shared two common notes. This theory elegantly accounted for the third relation and common tone progressions in earlier music of Schubert and Beethoven, and it paved the way for later chromatic composers who explored the compositional possibilities of tonal regions related by symmetrical augmented triads and diminished seventh chords.

== Works ==
- Der übermässige Dreiklang (Berlin, 1853) (The Augmented Triad)
- Der verminderte Septimenakkord (Berlin, 1854) (The Diminished Seventh Chord)
- Geschichte des Septimen-akkordes (Berlin, 1854) (History of Seventh Chords)
- Geschichte der griechischen Musik (Berlin, 1855) (History of Ancient Greek Music)
- Harmoniesystem (Leipzig, 1860, 2 cd printing 1895) (System of Harmony)
- Die neue Harmonielehre im Streit mit der alten (Leipzig, 1860) (The Conflict between New and Old Harmonic Theory)
- Geschichte des Clavierspiels und der Clavierlitteratur (History of Piano Playing and Piano Literature) (Stuttgart, 1863, expanded 1879); revised and edited by Max Seiffert as Geschichte der Klaviermusik (History of Piano Music) (Leipzig, 1899)
