= Pitch space =

Model for relationships between pitches

The circular pitch class space is an example of a pitch space.

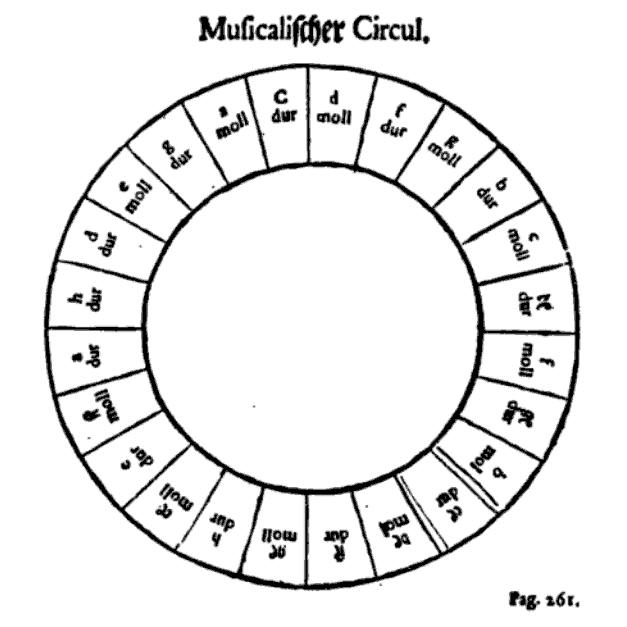
The circle of fifths is another example of pitch space.

In music theory, pitch spaces model relationships between pitches. These models typically use distance to model the degree of relatedness, with closely related pitches placed near one another, and less closely related pitches farther apart. Depending on the complexity of the relationships under consideration, the models may be multidimensional. Models of pitch space are often graphs, groups, lattices, or geometrical figures such as helixes. Pitch spaces distinguish octave-related pitches. When octave-related pitches are not distinguished, we have instead pitch class spaces, which represent relationships between pitch classes. (Some of these models are discussed in the entry on modulatory space, though readers should be advised that the term "modulatory space" is not a standard music-theoretical term.) Chordal spaces model relationships between chords.

== Linear and helical pitch space ==
The simplest pitch space model is the real line. A fundamental frequency f is mapped to a real number p according to the equation

$$p = 69 + 12\cdot\log_2 {(f/440)}
\,$$

This creates a linear space in which octaves have size 12, semitones (the distance between adjacent keys on the piano keyboard) have size 1, and middle C is assigned the number 60, as it is in MIDI. 440 Hz is the standard frequency of 'concert A', which is the note 9 semitones above 'middle C'. Distance in this space corresponds to physical distance on keyboard instruments, orthographical distance in Western musical notation, and psychological distance as measured in psychological experiments and conceived by musicians. The system is flexible enough to include "microtones" not found on standard piano keyboards. For example, the pitch halfway between C (60) and C# (61) can be labeled 60.5.

One problem with linear pitch space is that it does not model the special relationship between octave-related pitches, or pitches sharing the same pitch class. This has led theorists such as Moritz Wilhelm Drobisch (1846) and Roger Shepard (1982) to model pitch relations using a helix. In these models, linear pitch space is wrapped around a cylinder so that all octave-related pitches lie along a single line. Care must be taken when interpreting these models, as it is not clear how to interpret "distance" in the three-dimensional space containing the helix; nor is it clear how to interpret points in the three-dimensional space not contained on the helix itself.

== Higher-dimensional pitch spaces ==
Other theorists, such as Leonhard Euler (1739), Hermann von Helmholtz (1863/1885), Arthur von Oettingen (1866), Hugo Riemann (not to be confused with mathematician Bernhard Riemann), and Christopher Longuet-Higgins (1978) have modeled pitch relationships using two-dimensional (or higher-dimensional) lattices, under the name of Tonnetz. In these models, one dimension typically corresponds to acoustically pure perfect fifths while the other corresponds to major thirds. (Variations are possible in which one axis corresponds to acoustically pure minor thirds.) Additional dimensions can be used to represent additional intervals including—most typically—the octave.

A♯3	—	E♯4	—	B♯4	—	F5	—	C6	—	G6
|		|		|		|		|		|
F♯3	—	C♯4	—	G♯4	—	D♯5	—	A♯5	—	E♯6
|		|		|		|		|		|
D3	—	A3	—	E4	—	B4	—	F♯5	—	C♯6
|		|		|		|		|		|
B♭2	—	F3	—	C4	—	G4	—	D5	—	A5
|		|		|		|		|		|
G♭2	—	D♭3	—	A♭3	—	E♭4	—	B♭4	—	F5
|		|		|		|		|		|
E2	—	B2	—	F♭3	—	C♭4	—	G♭4	—	D♭5

All these models attempt to capture the fact that intervals separated by acoustically pure intervals such as octaves, perfect fifths, and major thirds are thought to be perceptually closely related. But proximity in these spaces need not represent physical proximity on musical instruments: by moving one's hands a very short distance on a violin string, one can move arbitrarily far in these multiple-dimensional models. For this reason, it is hard to assess the psychological relevance of distance as measured by these lattices.

== History of pitch space ==
The idea of pitch space goes back at least as far as the ancient Greek music theorists known as the Harmonists. To quote one of them, Bacchius: "And what is a diagram? A representation of a musical system. And we use a diagram so that, for students of the subject, matters which are hard to grasp with the hearing may appear before their eyes" (Bacchius, in Franklin, Diatonic Music in Ancient Greece). The Harmonists drew geometrical pictures so that the intervals of various scales could be compared visually; they thereby located the intervals in a pitch space.

Higher-dimensional pitch spaces have also long been investigated. The use of a lattice was proposed by Euler (1739) to model just intonation using an axis of perfect fifths and another of major thirds. Similar models were the subject of intense investigation in the 19th century, chiefly by theorists such as Oettingen and Riemann (Cohn 1997). Contemporary theorists such as James Tenney (1983) and W.A. Mathieu (1997) carry on this tradition.

Moritz Wilhelm Drobisch (1846) was the first to suggest a helix (i.e. the spiral of fifths) to represent octave equivalence and recurrence (Lerdahl, 2001), and hence to give a model of pitch space. Roger Shepard (1982) regularizes Drobish's helix, and extends it to a double helix of two wholetone scales over a circle of fifths which he calls the "melodic map" (Lerdahl, 2001). Michael Tenzer suggests its use for Balinese gamelan music since the octaves are not 2:1 and thus there is even less octave equivalence than in western tonal music (Tenzer, 2000). See also chromatic circle.

== Instrument design ==
Since the 19th century there have been many attempts to design isomorphic keyboards based on pitch spaces. The only ones to have caught on so far are several accordion layouts.

== See also ==
- Tonnetz
- Spiral array model
- Diatonic set theory
- Emancipation of the dissonance
- Unified field
- Vowel space
- Color space
