= Klumpenhouwer network =

7-note segment of interval cycle C7

In music, a Klumpenhouwer Network is "any network that uses T and/or I operations (transposition or inversion) to interpret interrelations among pcs" (pitch class sets). According to George Perle, "a Klumpenhouwer network is a chord analyzed in terms of its dyadic sums and differences," and "this kind of analysis of triadic combinations was implicit in," his "concept of the cyclic set from the beginning", cyclic sets being those "sets whose alternate elements unfold complementary cycles of a single interval." It is named for the Canadian music theorist Henry Klumpenhouwer, a former doctoral student of David Lewin's.

== Overview ==
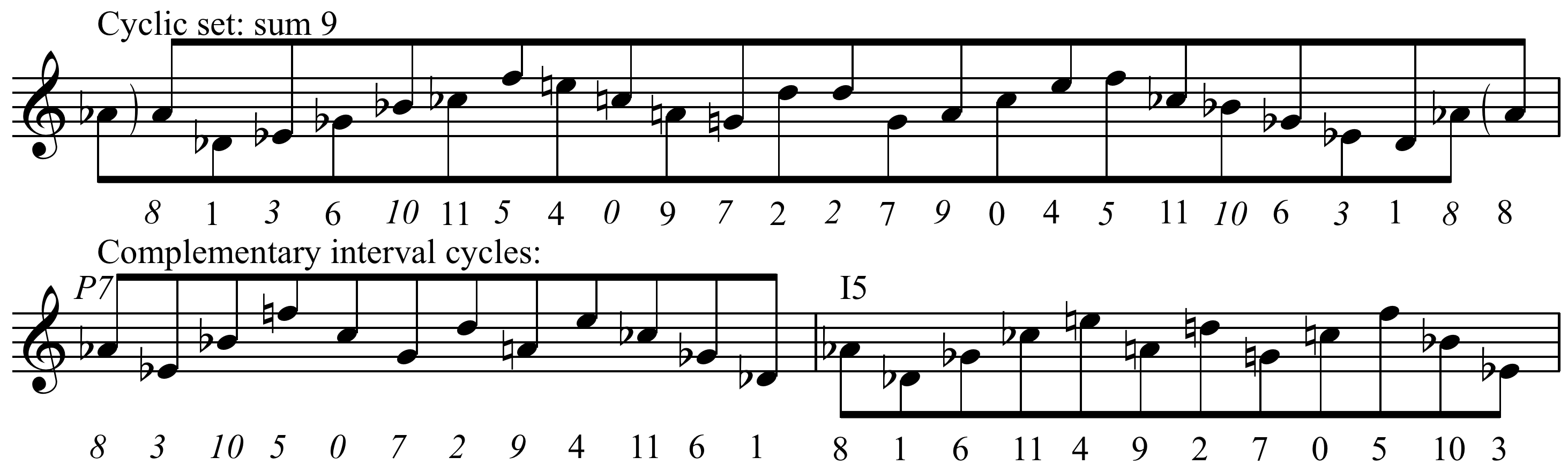
Cyclic set (sum 9) from Berg's Lyric Suite

"Klumpenhouwer's idea, both simple and profound in its implications, is to allow inversional, as well as transpositional, relations into networks like those of Figure 1," showing an arrow down from B to F♯ labeled T_{7}, down from F♯ to A labeled T_{3}, and back up from A to B, labeled T_{10} which allows it to be represented by Figure 2a, for example, labeled I_{5}, I_{3}, and T_{2}. In Figure 4 this is (b) I_{7}, I_{5}, T_{2} and (c) I_{5}, I_{3}, T_{2}.

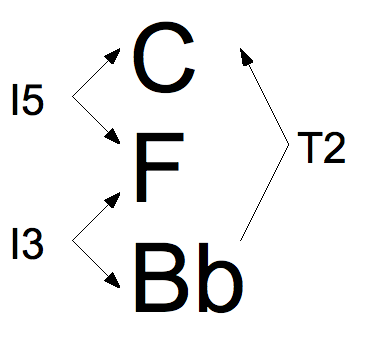
Chord 1. K-net relations, inversional and transpositional, represented through arrows, letters, and numbers.

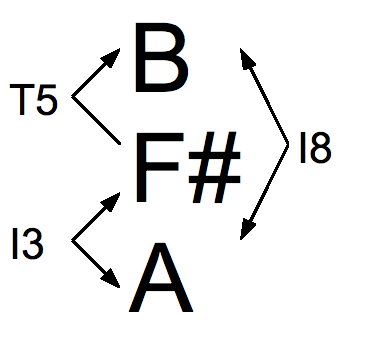
Chord 2. Inversional and transpositional K-net relations represented through arrows, letters, and numbers.

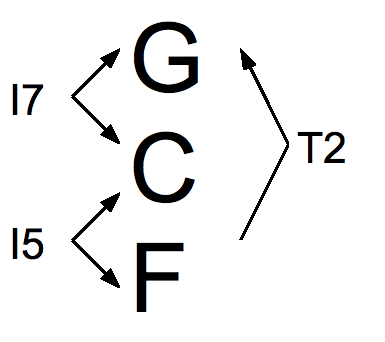
Chord 3. This chord with Chord 1 provide an example of rule #1 by way of a Network Isomorphism. [6]

Lewin asserts the "recursive potential of K-network analysis"... "'in great generality: When a system modulates by an operation A, the transformation f' = A f A -inverse plays the structural role in the modulated system that f played in the original system."

Given any network of pitch classes, and given any pc operation A, a second network may be derived from the first, and the relationship thereby derived 'network isomorphism' "arises between networks using analogous configurations of nodes and arrows to interpret pcsets that are of the same set class – 'isomorphism of graphs'. Two graphs are isomorphic when they share the same structure of nodes-and-arrows, and when also the operations labeling corresponding arrows correspond under a particular sort of mapping f among T/I."

"To generate isomorphic graphs, the mapping f must be what is called an automorphism of the T/I system. Networks that have isomorphic graphs are called isographic."

To be isographic, two networks must have these features:

1. They must have the same configuration of nodes and arrows.
2. There must be some isomorphism F that maps the transformation-system used to label the arrows of one network, into the transformation-system used to label the arrows of the other.
3. If the transformation X labels an arrow of the one network, then the transformation F(X) labels the corresponding arrow of the other."

"Two networks are positively isographic when they share the same configuration of nodes and arrows, when the T-numbers of corresponding arrows are equal, and when the I-numbers of corresponding arrows differ by some fixed number j mod 12." "We call networks that contain identical graphs 'strongly isographic'". "Let the family of transpositions and inversions on pitch classes be called 'the T/I group.'"

"Any network can be retrograded by reversing all arrows and adjusting the transformations accordingly."

Klumpenhouwer's [true] conjecture: "nodes (a) and (b), sharing the same configuration of arrows, will always be isographic if each T-number of Network (b) is the same as the corresponding T-number of Network (a), while each I-number of Network (b) is exactly j more than the corresponding I-number of Network (a), where j is some constant number modulo 12."

Five Rules for Isography of Klumpenhouwer Networks:

1. Klumpenhouwer Networks (a) and (b), sharing the same configuration of nodes and arrows, will be isographic under the circumstance that each T-number of Network (b) is the same as the corresponding T-number of Network (a), and each I-number of Network (b) is exactly j more than the corresponding I-number of Network (a). The pertinent automorphism of the T/I group is F(1,j): F(1,j)(T_{n})=T_{n}; F(1,j)(I_{n}) = I_{n+J}.
2. Klumpenhouwer Networks (a) and (b), will be isographic under the circumstance that each T-number of Network (b) is the complement of the corresponding T-number in Network (a), and each I-number of Network (b) is exactly j more than the complement of the corresponding I-number in Network (a)...F(11,j): F(11,j)(T_{n})=T_{−n}; F(11,j)(I_{n})=I_{−n+j}."
3. Klumpenhouwer Networks (a) and (b), will be isographic under the circumstance each T-number of Network (b) is 5 times the corresponding T-number in Network (a), and each I-number of Network (b) is exactly j more than 5 times the corresponding I-number in Network (a)...F(5,j): F(5,j)(T_{n})=T_{5n}; F(5,j)(I_{n})=I_{5n+j}.
4. Klumpenhouwer Networks (a) and (b), will be isographic under the circumstance each T-number of Network (b) is 7 times the corresponding T-number in Network (a), and each I-number of Network (b) is exactly j more than 7 times the corresponding I-number in Network (a)...F(7,j): F(7,j)(T_{n})=T_{7n}; F(7,j)(I_{n})=I_{7n+j}.
5. "Klumpenhouwer Networks (a) and (b), even if sharing the same configuration of nodes and arrows, will not be isographic under any other circumstances."

"Any one of Klupmenhouwer's triadic networks may thus be understood as a segment of cyclic set, and the interpretations of these and of the 'networks of networks'...efficiently and economically represented in this way."

If the graphs of chords are isomorphic by way of the appropriate F(u,j) operations, then they may be graphed as their own network.

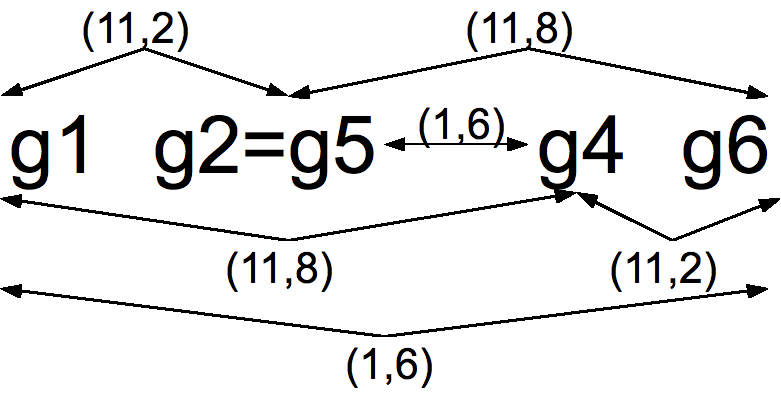
Graph of graphs from the six chords of Schoenberg's Pierrot lunaire, no. 4, mm. 13–14.

Klumpenhouwer network analysis has been brought to bear for an understanding of a wide range of post-tonal music, including the post-tonal works of Anton Webern.

Other terms include Lewin Transformational Network and strongly isomorphic.

== See also ==
- Interval class
- Isography
- Prolongation
- Similarity relation (music)
- Tone row
- Transformation (music)
- Lewin's Transformational theory
