= Donald Martino =

American classical composer

- Born: May 16, 1931; Plainfield, New Jersey
- Died: December 8, 2005 (aged 74); Antigua
- Education: Syracuse University; Princeton University
- Occupation: Composer
- Notable work: Notturno; Pianississimo
- Awards: Pulitzer Prize for Music (1974)

Donald James Martino (May 16, 1931 – December 8, 2005) was a Pulitzer Prize winning American composer.

== Biography ==
Born in Plainfield, New Jersey, Martino attended Plainfield High School. He began as a clarinetist, playing jazz for fun and profit. He attended Syracuse University, where he studied composition with Ernst Bacon, who encouraged him in that direction. He then attended Princeton University as a graduate student, where he worked with composers Roger Sessions and Milton Babbitt. He also studied with Luigi Dallapiccola in Italy as a Fulbright Scholar.

He became a lecturer and teacher himself, working with students at Yale University, the New England Conservatory of Music (where he became chair of the composition department), Brandeis University, and Harvard University.

He won the Pulitzer Prize for music in 1974 for his chamber work Notturno.

In 1991, the journal Perspectives of New Music published a 292-page tribute to Martino.

Martino died in Antigua in 2005. A memorial concert was held at the New England Conservatory on May 8, 2007. A recording of the concert was released by Navona Records in 2009.

== Music ==
Most of Martino's mature works (including pseudo-tonal works such as Paradiso Choruses and Seven Pious Pieces) were composed using the twelve-tone method; his sound world more closely resembled the lyrical Dallapiccola's than his other teachers'.

The pianist Easley Blackwood commissioned Martino's sonata Pianississimo, explicitly requesting that it be one of the most difficult pieces ever written. The resulting work is indeed of epic difficulty, but has been recorded several times. (Blackwood declined to perform it.)

Martino presented Milton Babbitt with at least two musical birthday cards: B,a,b,b,i,t,t on his 50th birthday and Triple Concerto on his 60th.

== Musical compositions ==
Many of the instrumental pieces have extensive doublings, such as flute/piccolo/alto flute. Principal publishers: Ione, Dantalian, McGinnis & Marx.

=== Works for orchestra and concertos ===
- Sinfonia, 1953, withdrawn, unpublished
- Contemplations, 1956
- Piano Concerto, 1965
- Mosaic for Grand Orchestra, 1967
- Cello Concerto, 1972
- Ritorno, 1976, arr. for band, 1977
- Triple Concerto, clarinet, bass clarinet, contrabass clarinet, 1977
- Divertisements for Youth Orchestra, 1981
- Alto Sax Concerto, 1987
- Violin Concerto, 1996
- Concertino (clarinet and orchestra), 2004
- Concerto for Orchestra, 2005

=== Chamber music ===
- Clarinet Sonata (clarinet, piano), 1950–51
- String Quartet No. 1, withdrawn, unpublished
- String Quartet No. 2, 1952, withdrawn, unpublished
- String Quartet Mo. 3, 1954, withdrawn, unpublished
- Violin Sonata (violin, piano), 1954
- Seven Canoni Enigmatici, canons with resolutions (2 violas, 2 ‘cellos/2 bassoons, 1955; string quartet, 1962; 2 clarinets, alto clarinet/basset horn, bass clarinet, 1966, may be combined with version of 1955)
- String Trio, 1955, withdrawn, unpublished
- Quartet (clarinet and string trio), 1957
- Trio (clarinet, violin, piano), 1959
- Five Frammenti (oboe, double bass), 1961
- Concerto (wind quintet), 1964
- Notturno (piccolo/flute/alto flute, clarinet/bass clarinet, violin, viola, ‘cello, piano, percussion), 1973
- String Quartet [No. 4], 1983
- Canzone e Tarantella sul Nome Petrassi (clarinet, ‘cello), 1984
- From the Other Side (flute, ‘cello, piano, percussion), 1988
- Three Sad Songs (viola, piano), 1991
- Octet (flute, clarinet, flugelhorn, trombone, percussion, piano, violin, ‘cello), 1998
- Serenata Concertante (flute, clarinet, flugel horn, French horn, percussion, piano, violin, ‘cello), 1999
- Violin Sonata No. 2 (violin, piano), 2004
- String Quartet No. 5, 2004
- Trio (violin, cello, piano), 2004
- Trio (clarinet, cello, piano), 2004

=== Works for solo instrument ===
- Suite of Variations on Medieval Melodies (‘cello), 1952, rev. 1954
- A Set (clarinet), 1954, rev. 1974
- Harmonica Piece, 1954
- Quodlibets (flute), 1954
- Fantasy (piano), 1958
- Fantasy-Variations (violin), 1962
- Parisonatina al’dodecafonia (‘cello), 1964
- B, A, B, B, IT, T (clarinet with extensions), 1966
- Strata (bass clarinet), 1966
- Pianississimo, piano sonata, 1970
- Impromptu for Roger (piano), 1977
- Fantasies and Impromptus (piano), 1980
- Quodlibets II (flute), 1980
- Suite in Old Form (Parody Suite) (piano), 1982
- Twelve Preludes (piano), 1991
- 15, 5, 92, A.B. (clarinet), 1992
- A Birthday Card for Alea III (clarinet), 1997
- Romanza (violin), 2000
- Sonata (violin), 2003

=== Vocal works ===
- Separate Songs (high voice and piano), 1951
1. All day I hear the noise of waters (James Joyce)
2. The half-moon westers low, my love (A. E. Housman)
- From "The Bad Child’s Book of Beasts" (Hilaire Belloc) (high voice and piano), 1952
1. The Lion, the Tiger
2. The Frog
3. The Microbe
- Portraits: a Secular Cantata (Edna St. Vincent Millay, Walt Whitman, E. E. Cummings) (mezzo-soprano and baritone solos, chorus, orchestra), 1954
- Arrangement of Anyone lived in a pretty how town (SATB chorus, piano 4 hands, optional percussion, 1955
- Three Songs (James Joyce) (soprano/tenor or bass, piano), 1955
1. Alone
2. Tutto e sciolto (in English)
3. A Memory of the Players in a Mirror at Midnight
- Two Rilke Songs (mezzo-soprano and piano), 1961
1. Die Laute
2. Aus einem Sturmnacht VIII;
- Seven Pious Pieces (Robert Herrick) (chorus with optional piano/organ), 1972
- Paradiso Choruses (Dante) (solo voices, chorus, orchestra, tape), 1974
- The White Island (SATB chorus and chamber orchestra), 1985

=== Film scores ===
- The White Rooster, c1950, unpublished
- The Lonely Crime, 1958, unpublished

=== Other works ===
- Augenmusik, a Mixed Mediocritique (actress/danseuse/uninhibited female percussionist, tape), 1972
- Many popular songs and jazz arrangements, all unpublished

== Sources ==
- Barkin, Elaine, and Martin Brody (2006). "Martino, Donald (James)". Grove Music Online, edited by Deane L. Root. (updated 18 January). Oxford Music Online (accessed 26 August 2017).
- Fischer, Heinz-Dietrich, ed. (2001). "1974 Award: About the Chamber Music Piece Notturno by Donald J. Martino". In The Pulitzer Prize Archives: Part E, Liberal Arts: Volume 15, Musical Composition Awards 1943-1999: From Aaron Copland and Samuel Barber to Gian-Carlo Menotti and Melinda Wagner, edited by Heinz-Dietrich Fischer in cooperation with Erika J. Fischer, 121–24. Munich: K. G. Sauer. ISBN 3-598-30185-5.
- Griffiths, Paul (2002). "Martino, Donald (James)". The Oxford Companion to Music, edited by Alison Latham. Oxford and New York: Oxford University Press. ISBN 978-0-19-866212-9
- Los Angeles Times Staff (2005). Los Angeles Times: Obituary of Donald Martino. Retrieved December 25, 2005.
- Villamil, Victoria Etnier (1993), A Singer's Guide to American Art Song (paperback ed.), Lanham, Maryland: The Scarecrow Press, Inc., ISBN 0-8108-5217-9

== Bibliography ==
=== Articles by Martino ===
- Martino, Donald. 1961. "The Source Set and Its Aggregate Formations." Journal of Music Theory 5: 224-273.
- Martino, Donald. 1964. "Claudio Spies: 'Tempi'." Perspectives of New Music 2/2: 112-124.
- Martino, Donald. 1966. "Notation in General - Articulation in Particular." Perspectives of New Music 4/2: 47-58.
- Martino, Donald, and Ricci, Robert. 1968. "Wherefore Modern Music?" Music Educators Journal 55: 94-96.
- Martino, Donald. 1971. "In Memoriam Stravinsky." Perspectives of New Music 9/2-10/1: 64.
- Martino, Donald. 1972. "Exotic Winds." The Musical Times 113/1555: 865.
- Martino, Donald. 1974. "In Memoriam Dallapiccola." Perspectives of New Music 13/1: 240-245.

=== Interview with Martino ===
- Martino, Donald, and Boros, James. 1991. "A Conversation with Donald Martino." Perspectives of New Music 29/2 (Summer): 212-278.

=== Further reading ===
- Boros, James. 1991. "Donald Martino's Fantasy Variations: The First Three Measures." Perspectives of New Music 29/2 (Summer): 280-293.
- Brody, Martin. 1991. "MSHJ: Faith and Deeds in The White Island." Perspectives of New Music 29/2 (Summer): 294-311.
- Dembski, Stephen. 1991. "Misreading Martino." Perspectives of New Music 29/2 (Summer): 312-317.
- Fogg, Jonathan Leonard Ryan. 2006. An Aggregate of Styles: Donald Martino's 'Fantasies and Impromptus'. A Treatise presented in partial fulfillment of the requirements for the Degree of Doctor of Musical Arts, Graduate School of The University of Texas at Austin.
- Kizas, Andrew J. 2004. From Octatonicism to Dodecaphony: A Study of Pitch Organization in Selected Works by Donald Martino. A Dissertation prepared for the Degree of Ph.D., University of Western Ontario.
- Kizas, Andrew J. 2009. The Music of Donald Martino: A Theory of Pitch Organization in Selected Works. Saarbrücken, Germany: VDM Verlag.
- Klumpenhouwer, Henry. 1991. "Aspects of Row Structure and Harmony in Martino's Impromptu Number 6." Perspectives of New Music 29/2 (Summer): 318-354.
- Krims, Adam. 1991. "Some Analytical Comments on Text and Music in Martino's 'Alone'." Perspectives of New Music 29/2 (Summer): 356-380.
- Kyr, Robert. 1991. "Point/Counter-Point: Donald Martino's Radical Statement of Mind and Soul." Perspectives of New Music 29/2 (Summer): 382-392.
- Littleton, Laurann. 1981. An Analysis of Martino's 'Fantasies and Impromptus' For Solo Piano. A Thesis submitted in partial fulfillment of the requirements for the Degree of Master of Arts, Eastman School of Music.
- Nicholls, David. 1992. "Donald Martino: a survey of his recent music." Music & Letters 73/1: 75-79.
- Rothstein, William. 1980 "Linear Structure in the Twelve-Tone System: An Analysis of Donald Martino's 'Pianississimo'." Journal of Music Theory 24: 129-165.
- Stadelman, Jeffrey. 1991. "A Symmetry of Thought." Perspectives of New Music 29/2 (Summer): 402-439.
- Vishio, Anton. 1991. "An Investigation of Structure and Experience in Martino Space." Perspectives of New Music 29/2 (Summer): 440-476.
- Webb, Glenn. 2014. The Percussion Music of Donald Martino. A document submitted in partial fulfillment of the requirements for the Degree of Doctor of Musical Arts, University of Nevada.
- Weinberg, Henry. 1963. "Donald Martino: 'Trio' (1959)." Perspectives of New Music 2/1 (Fall-Winter): 82-90.
- Yang, Yoon Joo. 2011. A Practical Approach to Donald Martino's Twelve-Tone Song Cycles: 'Three Songs' and 'Two Rilke Songs,' for Performance. A Dissertation prepared for the Degree of Doctor of Musical Arts, University of North Texas.
