= Transformational theory =

Branch of music theory

Schematic of the transformational situation: "s" and "t" are objects; pitches, pitch-class sets, chords, harmonies, etc.; and "i" is the relationship or "interval" between the two objects.

Transformational theory is a branch of music theory developed by David Lewin in the 1980s, and formally introduced in his 1987 work Generalized Musical Intervals and Transformations. The theory—which models musical transformations as elements of a mathematical group—can be used to analyze both tonal and atonal music.

The goal of transformational theory is to change the focus from musical objects—such as the "C major chord" or "G major chord"—to relations between musical objects (related by transformation). Thus, instead of saying that a C major chord is followed by G major, a transformational theorist might say that the first chord has been "transformed" into the second by the "Dominant operation." (Symbolically, one might write "Dominant(C major) = G major.") While traditional musical set theory focuses on the makeup of musical objects, transformational theory focuses on the intervals or types of musical motion that can occur. According to Lewin's description of this change in emphasis, "[The transformational] attitude does not ask for some observed measure of extension between reified 'points'; rather it asks: 'If I am at s and wish to get to t, what characteristic gesture should I perform in order to arrive there?'" (from Generalized Musical Intervals and Transformations (GMIT), p. 159)

== Formalism ==
The formal setting for Lewin's theory is a set S (or "space") of musical objects, and a set T of transformations on that space. Transformations are modeled as functions acting on the entire space, meaning that every transformation must be applicable to every object.

Lewin points out that this requirement significantly constrains the spaces and transformations that can be considered. For example, if the space S is the space of diatonic triads (represented by the Roman numerals I, ii, iii, IV, V, vi, and vii°), the "Dominant transformation" must be defined so as to apply to each of these triads. This means, for example, that some diatonic triad must be selected as the "dominant" of the diminished triad on vii. Ordinary musical discourse, however, typically holds that the "dominant" relationship is only between the I and V chords. (Certainly, no diatonic triad is ordinarily considered the dominant of the diminished triad.) In other words, "dominant," as used informally, is not a function that applies to all chords, but rather describes a particular relationship between two of them.

There are, however, any number of situations in which "transformations" can extend to an entire space. Here, transformational theory provides a degree of abstraction that could be a significant music-theoretical asset. One transformational network can describe the relationships among musical events in more than one musical excerpt, thus offering an elegant way of relating them. For example, figure 7.9 in Lewin's GMIT can describe the first phrases of both the first and third movements of Beethoven's Symphony No. 1 in C Major, Op. 21. In this case, the transformation graph's objects are the same in both excerpts from the Beethoven Symphony, but this graph could apply to many more musical examples when the object labels are removed. Further, such a transformational network that gives only the intervals between pitch classes in an excerpt may also describe the differences in the relative durations of another excerpt in a piece, thus succinctly relating two different domains of music analysis. Lewin's observation that only the transformations, and not the objects on which they act, are necessary to specify a transformational network is the main benefit of transformational analysis over traditional object-oriented analysis.

== Transformations as functions ==
The "transformations" of transformational theory are typically modeled as functions that act over some musical space S, meaning that they are entirely defined by their inputs and outputs: for instance, the "ascending major third" might be modeled as a function that takes a particular pitch class as input and outputs the pitch class a major third above it.

However, several theorists have pointed out that ordinary musical discourse often includes more information than functions. For example, a single pair of pitch classes (such as C and E) can stand in multiple relationships: E is both a major third above C and a minor sixth below it. (This is analogous to the fact that, on an ordinary clockface, the number 4 is both four steps clockwise from 12 and 8 steps counterclockwise from it.) For this reason, theorists such as Dmitri Tymoczko have proposed replacing Lewinnian "pitch class intervals" with "paths in pitch class space". More generally, this suggests that there are situations where it might not be useful to model musical motion ("transformations" in the intuitive sense) using functions ("transformations" in the strict sense of Lewinnian theory).

Another issue concerns the role of "distance" in transformational theory. In the opening pages of GMIT, Lewin suggests that a subspecies of "transformations" (namely, musical intervals) can be used to model "directed measurements, distances, or motions". However, the mathematical formalism he uses—which models "transformations" by group elements—does not obviously represent distances, since group elements are not typically considered to have size. (Groups are typically individuated only up to isomorphism, and isomorphism does not necessarily preserve the "sizes" assigned to group elements.) Theorists such as Ed Gollin, Dmitri Tymoczko, and Rachel Hall, have all written about this subject, with Gollin attempting to incorporate "distances" into a broadly Lewinnian framework.

Tymoczko's "Generalizing Musical Intervals" contains one of the few extended critiques of transformational theory, arguing (1) that intervals are sometimes "local" objects that, like vectors, cannot be transported around a musical space; (2) that musical spaces often have boundaries, or multiple paths between the same points, both prohibited by Lewin's formalism; and (3) that transformational theory implicitly relies on notions of distance extraneous to the formalism as such.

== Reception ==
Although transformational theory originated in the 1980s, it did not become a widespread theoretical or analytical pursuit until the late 1990s. Following Lewin's revival (in GMIT) of Hugo Riemann's three contextual inversion operations on triads (parallel, relative, and Leittonwechsel) as formal transformations, the branch of transformation theory called Neo-Riemannian theory was popularized by Brian Hyer (1995), Michael Kevin Mooney (1996), Richard Cohn (1997), and an entire issue of the Journal of Music Theory (42/2, 1998). Transformation theory has received further treatment by Fred Lerdahl (2001), Julian Hook (2002), David Kopp (2002), and many others.

The status of transformational theory is currently a topic of debate in music-theoretical circles. Some authors, such as Ed Gollin, Dmitri Tymoczko and Julian Hook, have argued that Lewin's transformational formalism is too restrictive, and have called for extending the system in various ways. Others, such as Richard Cohn and Steven Rings, while acknowledging the validity of some of these criticisms, continue to use broadly Lewinnian techniques.

== See also ==
- Pitch space
- Interval vector
- Musical transformation
