= Lattice (music) =

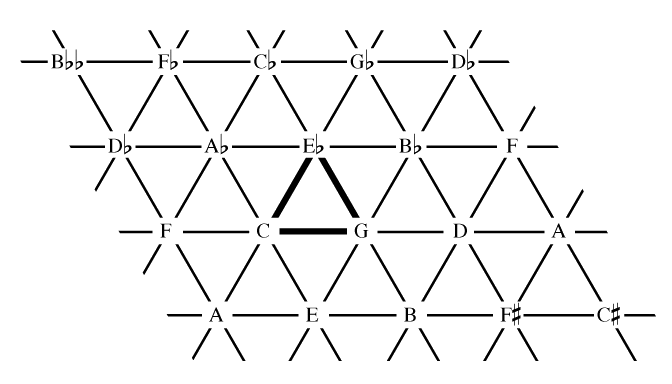
On the Tonnetz in neo-Riemmanian form, pitches are connected by lines if they are separated by minor third (/), major third (\), or perfect fifth (—).

A lattice in the Euclidean plane.

In musical tuning, a lattice

"is a way of modeling the tuning relationships of a just intonation system. It is an array of points in a periodic multidimensional pattern. Each point on the lattice corresponds to a ratio (i.e., a pitch, or an interval with respect to some other point on the lattice). The lattice can be two-, three-, or p-dimensional, with each dimension corresponding to a different prime-number partial [pitch class]." — Gilmore (2006)

When listed in a spreadsheet a lattice may be called a tuning table.

== Construction ==
The points in a lattice represent pitch classes (or pitches if octaves are represented), and the connectors in a lattice represent the intervals between them. The connecting lines in a lattice display intervals as vectors, so that a line of the same length and angle always has the same intervalic relationship between the points it connects, no matter where it occurs in the lattice.

Repeatedly adding the same vector (repeatedly stacking the same interval) moves you further in the same direction. Lattices in just intonation (limited to intervals comprising primes, their powers, and their products) are theoretically infinite (because no power of any prime equals any power of another prime). However, lattices are sometimes also used to notate limited subsets that are particularly interesting (such as an Eikosany illustrated further below or the various ways to extract particular scale shapes from a larger lattice).

== Use of musical lattices ==
Examples of musical lattices include the tonnetz of Euler (1739) and Hugo Riemann and the tuning systems of composer-theorists Ben Johnston and James Tenney. Musical intervals in just intonation are related to those in equal tuning by Adriaan Fokker's Fokker periodicity blocks. Many multi-dimensional higher-limit tunings have been mapped by Erv Wilson. The limit is the highest prime number used in the ratios that define the intervals used by a tuning.

Thus Pythagorean tuning, which uses only the perfect fifth (3:2) and octave (2:1) and their multiples (powers of 2 and 3), is represented through a two-dimensional lattice (or, given octave equivalence, a single dimension), while standard (5-limit) just intonation, which adds the use of the just major third (5:4), may be represented through a three-dimensional lattice though

"a twelve-note 'chromatic' scale may be represented as a two-dimensional (3,5) projection plane within the three-dimensional (2,3,5) space needed to map the scale. (Note: The dimensions required for p-limit tuning are equal to the prime-counting function minus one: $\ =\ \pi(p) - 1 ~.$) (Octave equivalents would appear on an axis at right angles to the other two, but this arrangement is not really necessary graphically.)". — Gilmore (2006)

In other words, the circle of fifths on one dimension and a series of major thirds on those fifths in the second (horizontal and vertical), with the option of imagining depth to model octaves:

Tone net for 5-limit just intonation

  ---A ---E ---B ---F♯￪-      --5:3--5:4-15:8-45:32-
  \ /  \ /  \ /  \ /         \ /  \ /  \ /  \ /
 --F----C----G----D---  =  --4:3--1:1--3:2--9:8-
  / \  / \  / \  / \         / \  / \  / \  / \
-D♭￬--A♭-—-E♭—--B♭---     -16:15-8:5--6:5--9:5--

/ = major third \ = minor third — = perfect fifth
N^{￬} = note N pitch flattened by one syntonic comma (≈ 211/2 cents);
N^{￪} = note N sharpened one syntonic comma.

Erv Wilson has made significant headway with developing lattices than can represent higher limit harmonics, meaning more than 2 dimensions, while displaying them in 2 dimensions.

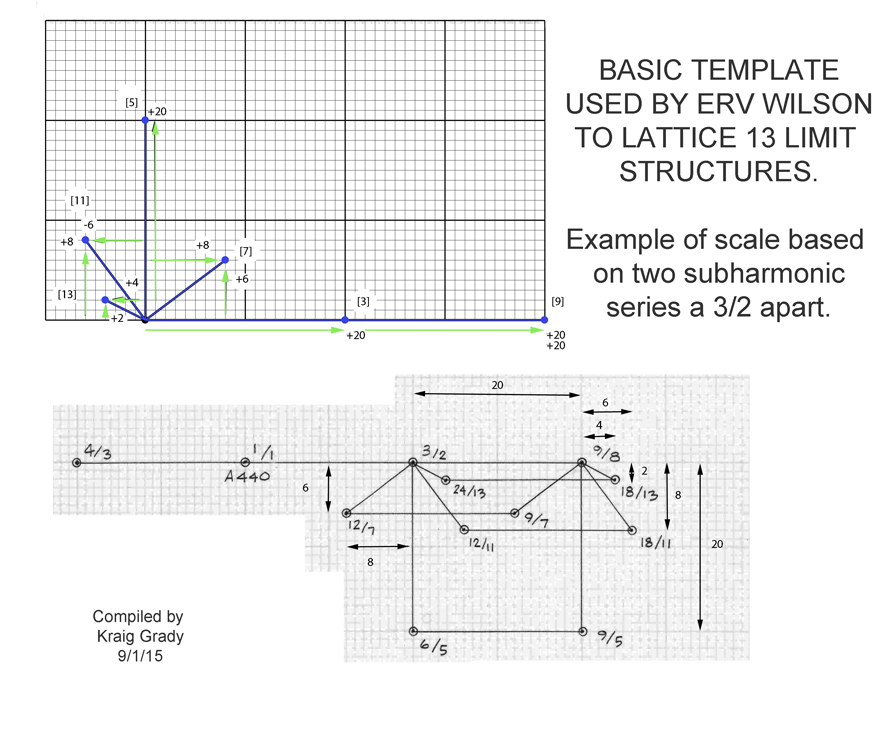
Wilson template for mapping higher limit systems

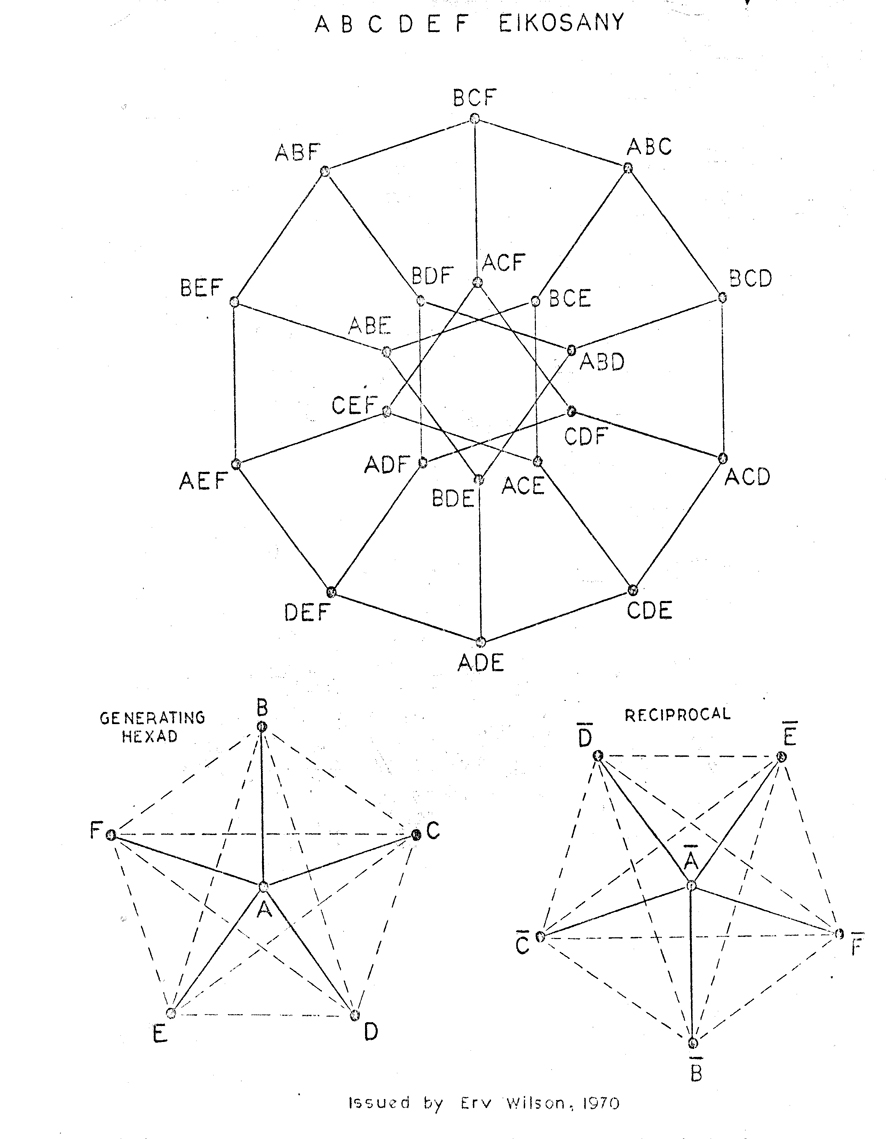
A lattice showing Erv Wilson's Eikosany structure. This template can be used with any 6 ratios

To the right are templates Wilson used to generate what he called an Euler lattice after the German mathematician who introduced the tonnetz it is modeled after. Each prime harmonic (each vector representing a ratio of 1/p or p/1 where p is a prime) has a unique spacing, avoiding clashes even when generating lattices of multidimensional, harmonically based structure. (Note: Wilson would commonly use 10 squares-to-the-inch graph paper. That way, he had room to notate both ratios and often the scale degree, which explains why he didn't use a template where all the numbers where divided by 2. The scale degree always followed a period or dot to separate it from the ratios.)

=== Examples of temperament dimensionality ===
One dimensional

- Pythagorean tuning (3:2)
- Equal temperaments including
  - 12-tone equal temperament = 2^{1/12} (or 2^{7/12})
  - 24-tet = 2^{1/24}
  - 31-tet = 2^{1/31}
- Meantone temperaments including
  - quarter-comma meantone = $\sqrt[5]{4}$

Two dimensional

- 5-limit just intonation (3:2 and 5:4)
- 833 cents scale (golden ratio $\varphi$ and 3:2)

Three dimensional

- 7-limit just intonation (3:2, 5:4, and 7:4)

== See also ==
- tonality diamond
- tonnetz (tone net)
