= Chordal space =

Concept in music theory

Music theorists have often used graphs, tilings, and geometrical spaces to represent the relationship between chords. These spaces can be described as chord spaces or chordal spaces, though the terms are relatively recent in origin.

== History of chordal space ==
One of the earliest graphical models of chord-relationships was devised by Johann David Heinichen in 1728; he proposed placing the major and minor chords in a circular arrangement of twenty-four chords arranged according to the circle of fifths; reading clockwise, ... F, d, C, a, G, ... (Capital letters represent major chords and small letters represent minor.) 1737, David Kellner proposed an alternate arrangement, with the 12 major chords and 12 minor chords placed on concentric circles. Each chord was vertically aligned with its relative major or minor.

F	C	G	D	A
d	a	e	b	f^{♯}

F. G. Vial and Gottfried Weber suggested a grid graph or square lattice model of chordal space; Weber's graph, centered on C major, is:

d^{♯}	F^{♯}	f^{♯}	A	a	C	c
g^{♯}	B	b	D	d	F	f
c^{♯}	E	e	G	g	B^{♭}	b^{♭}
f^{♯}	A	a	C	c	E^{♭}	e^{♭}
b	D	d	F	f	A^{♭}	a^{♭}
e	G	g	B^{♭}	b^{♭}	D^{♭}	d^{♭}
a	C	c	E^{♭}	e^{♭}	G^{♭}	g^{♭}

This was first proposed by Vial (1767) and later used by Gottfried Weber, Hugo Riemann, and Arnold Schoenberg. Its advantage over Heinichen's and Kellner's models is that it represents a much richer set of chordal relationships. On the graph, every triad is related to its upper and lower neighbors by fifth-transposition; its left and right neighbors are its parallel and relative triads. In addition, every major triad is diagonally adjacent to the minor triad whose root is a major third above, and which shares two of its three notes (this is the diagonal above and to the left); every minor triad is diagonally adjacent to the major triad whose root is a third below, and which shares two of its three notes (this is the diagonal below and to the right). A variety of other common-tone and voice leading relationships can be found among neighboring triads on the graph.

== Principles of chordal space ==
The Vial/Weber chordal space depicts two different sorts of relationships: shared common tones and efficient voice leading. For example, the proximity of the C major and e minor chords reflects the fact that the two chords share two common tones, E and G. Moreover, one chord can be transformed into another by moving a single note by just one semitone: to transform a C major chord into an E minor chord, one need only move C to B. Furthermore, the Vial/Weber chordal space is closely related to the two-dimensional lattices described in the article on pitch space: every chord on the Vial/Weber chordal space can be associated with a triangle on the "Tonnetz" or two-dimensional pitch space discussed there.

The close correspondence between these properties — shared common tones, efficient voice leading, and the two-dimensional pitch lattices — is in some sense a lucky accident. As Richard Cohn (1997) explained, analogous constructions depicting relationships among other types of chords do not have these properties.

Interest in common-tones and voice leading gradually led music theorists to modify Heinichen's original proposal. In the circular arrangement F - d - C - a ..., the chords F and d share two common tones, and can be linked by efficient voice leading. However, the chords d and C do not share any common tones, and cannot be linked by very efficient voice leading. By contrast in the series C - a - F - d ..., every chord shares two notes with its neighbors and can be transformed into them by moving one note by one or two semitones. The resulting pattern of chords can be generated in the Vial/Weber space, by moving upward along adjacent columns in the space.

== See also ==
- Pitch space
- Pitch class space
