= Cognate set =

Cognate set may refer to two entities:

- in music theory, a cognate set is a type of cyclic set
- in historical linguistics, a cognate set is a set of cognates, i.e. of words descended from the same etymon.
