= Tonnetz =

Diagram of harmonic relations in music

A modern rendering of the Tonnetz. The A minor triad is in dark blue, and the C major triad is in dark red. Interpreted as a torus, the Tonnetz has 12 nodes (pitches) and 24 triangles (triads).

In musical tuning and harmony, the Tonnetz (German for 'tone net') is a conceptual lattice diagram representing tonal space first described by Leonhard Euler in 1739. Various visual representations of the Tonnetz can be used to show traditional harmonic relationships in European classical music.

== History through 1900 ==
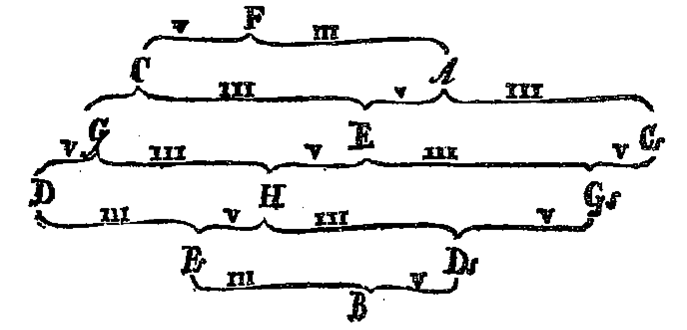
Euler's Tonnetz

The Tonnetz originally appeared in Leonhard Euler's 1739 Tentamen novae theoriae musicae ex certissismis harmoniae principiis dilucide expositae. Euler's Tonnetz, pictured at left, shows the triadic relationships of the perfect fifth and the major third: at the top of the image is the note F, and to the left underneath is C (a perfect fifth above F), and to the right is A (a major third above F). Gottfried Weber, Versuch einer geordneten Theorie der Tonsetzkunst, discusses the relationships between keys, presenting them in a network analogous to Euler's Tonnetz, but showing keys rather than notes. The Tonnetz itself was rediscovered in 1858 by Ernst Naumann in his Harmoniesystem in dualer Entwickelung., and was disseminated in an 1866 treatise of Arthur von Oettingen. Oettingen and the influential musicologist Hugo Riemann (not to be confused with the mathematician Bernhard Riemann) explored the capacity of the space to chart harmonic modulation between chords and motion between keys. Similar understandings of the Tonnetz appeared in the work of many late-19th century German music theorists.

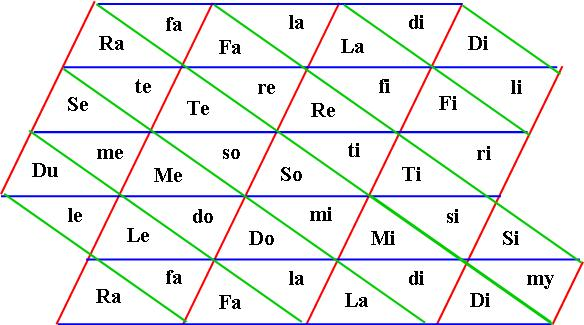
Tonnetz showing enclosed chords. Capitalized chords ('Xx') are major; others ('xx') are minor.

Oettingen and Riemann both conceived of the relationships in the chart being defined through just intonation, which uses pure intervals. One can extend out one of the horizontal rows of the Tonnetz indefinitely, to form a never-ending sequence of perfect fifths: F-C-G-D-A-E-B-F♯-C♯-G♯-D♯-A♯-E♯-B♯-F𝄪-C𝄪-G𝄪- (etc.) Starting with F, after 12 perfect fifths, one reaches E♯. Perfect fifths in just intonation are slightly larger than the compromised fifths used in equal temperament tuning systems more common in the present. This means that when one stacks 12 fifths starting from F, the E♯ we arrive at will not be seven octaves above the F we started with. Oettingen and Riemann's Tonnetz thus extended on infinitely in every direction without actually repeating any pitches. In the twentieth century, composer-theorists such as Ben Johnston and James Tenney continued to develop theories and applications involving just-intoned Tonnetze.

The appeal of the Tonnetz to 19th-century German theorists was that it allows spatial representations of tonal distance and tonal relationships. For example, looking at the dark blue A minor triad in the graphic at the beginning of the article, its parallel major triad (A-C♯-E) is the triangle right below, sharing the vertices A and E. The relative major of A minor, C major (C-E-G) is the upper-right adjacent triangle, sharing the C and the E vertices. The dominant triad of A minor, E major (E-G♯-B) is diagonally across the E vertex, and shares no other vertices. One important point is that every shared vertex between a pair of triangles is a shared pitch between chords - the more shared vertices, the more shared pitches the chords will have. This provides a visualization of the principle of parsimonious voice-leading, in which motions between chords are considered smoother when fewer pitches change. This principle is especially important in analyzing the music of late-19th century composers like Wagner, who frequently avoided traditional tonal relationships.

== Twentieth-century reinterpretation ==
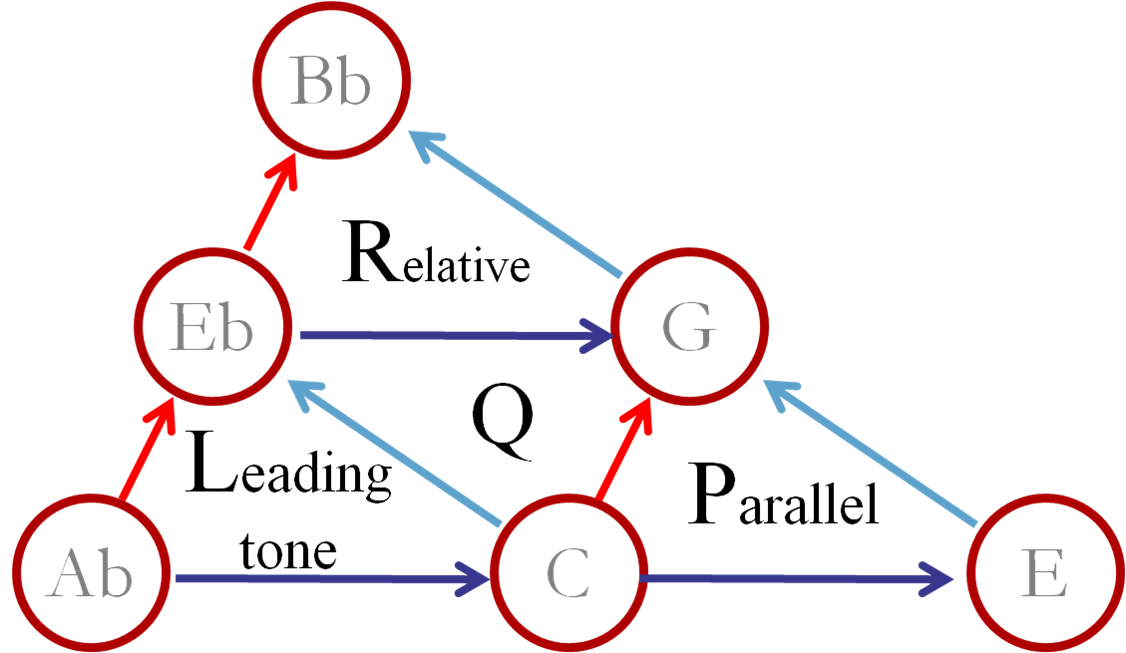
Neo-Riemannian music theory's PLR operations applied to a minor chord Q.

Neo-Riemannian music theorists David Lewin and Brian Hyer revived the Tonnetz to further explore properties of pitch structures. Modern music theorists generally construct the Tonnetz in equal temperament and without distinction between octave transpositions of a pitch (i.e., using pitch classes). Under equal temperament, the never-ending series of ascending fifths mentioned earlier becomes a cycle. Neo-Riemannian theorists typically assume enharmonic equivalence (in other words, A♭ = G♯), and so the two-dimensional plane of the 19th-century Tonnetz cycles in on itself in two different directions and is mathematically isomorphic to a torus.

Neo-Riemannian theorists have also used the Tonnetz to visualize non-tonal triadic relationships. For example, the diagonal going up and to the left from C in the diagram at the beginning of the article forms a division of the octave in three major thirds: C-A♭-E-C (the E is actually an F♭, and the final C a D♭♭). Richard Cohn argues that while a sequence of triads built on these three pitches (C major, A♭ major, and E major) cannot be adequately described using traditional concepts of functional harmony, this cycle has smooth voice leading and other important group properties which can be easily observed on the Tonnetz.

== Similarities to other graphical systems ==
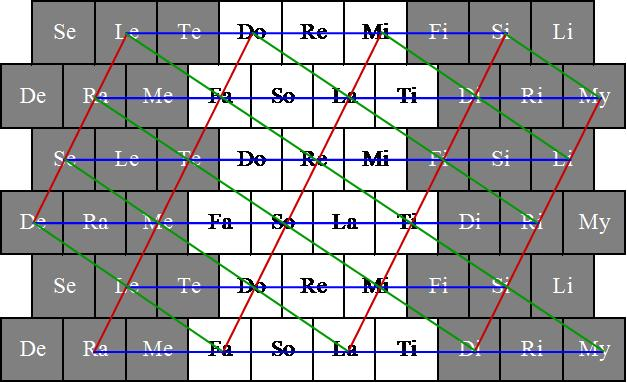
Tonnetz aligned with the Wicki–Hayden note layout.

The harmonic table note layout is a note layout that is topologically equivalent to the Tonnetz, and is used on several musical instruments that allow playing major and minor chords with a single finger.

The Tonnetz can be overlaid on the Wicki–Hayden note layout, where the major second can be found halfway towards the major third.

The Tonnetz is the dual graph of Schoenberg's chart of the regions, and of course vice versa. Research into music cognition has demonstrated that the human brain uses a "chart of the regions" to process tonal relationships.

== See also ==
- Chordal space
- Fokker periodicity block
- Neo-Riemannian theory
- Musical set-theory
- Riemannian theory
- Transformational theory
- Tuning theory
- Traité de l'harmonie réduite à ses principes naturels
