= Henry Klumpenhouwer =

Canadian Musicologist

Henry Klumpenhouwer is a Canadian musicologist and former professor at the University of Alberta and the Eastman School of Music. A former PhD student of David Lewin and the inventor of Klumpenhouwer networks, which are named after him, he is the former editor of Music Theory Spectrum.

== See also ==
- Transformational theory

== Bibliography ==
- Klumpenhouwer, Henry (1991). "Aspects of Row Structure and Harmony in Martino's Impromptu Number 6", p. 318n1, Perspectives of New Music, Vol. 29, No. 2 (Summer), pp. 318–354.
- Klumpenhouwer, Henry (1992). "The Cartesian Choir", Music Theory Spectrum.
