= Music Theory Spectrum =

- Discipline: Music theory
- Language: English
- Edited by: Marianne Wheeldon

Publication details
- History: 1979-present
- Publisher: Oxford University Press (United States)
- Frequency: Biannually

Standard abbreviations
- ISO 4: Music Theory Spectr.

Indexing
- ISSN: 0195-6167 (print); 1533-8339 (web)
- LCCN: 79644237
- JSTOR: 01956167
- OCLC no.: 225222134

Links
- Journal homepage

Music Theory Spectrum (ISSN 0195-6167) is a peer-reviewed, academic journal specializing in music theory and analysis. It is the official journal of the Society for Music Theory, and is published by Oxford University Press. The journal was first published in 1979 as the official organ of the Society for Music Theory, which had been founded in 1977 and had its first conference in 1978. Unlike many other journals (music or otherwise), Music Theory Spectrum was initially published in an oblong (landscape) page format, to better accommodate such musical graphics as Schenkerian graphs.

Published twice annually, Music Theory Spectrum includes research articles and book reviews. Online access to back issues of the journal up 2017 is provided through JSTOR. In a 1999 study, it was the seventh most frequently cited journal in music theses overall, and the third most frequently cited journal in music theory theses.

In Spring 2014, Oxford University Press began publishing Music Theory Spectrum, beginning with Volume 36, Issue 1. It replaced the University of California Press.

Music Theory Spectrum is currently edited by Laura Emmery. Its first editor was Bryan Simms, and other past editors have included Peter Smith, Marianne Wheeldon, Severine Neff, Joel Lester, Philip Lambert, Daniel Harrison, and Henry Klumpenhouwer.
