= Riemannian theory =

Musical theories of Hugo Riemann

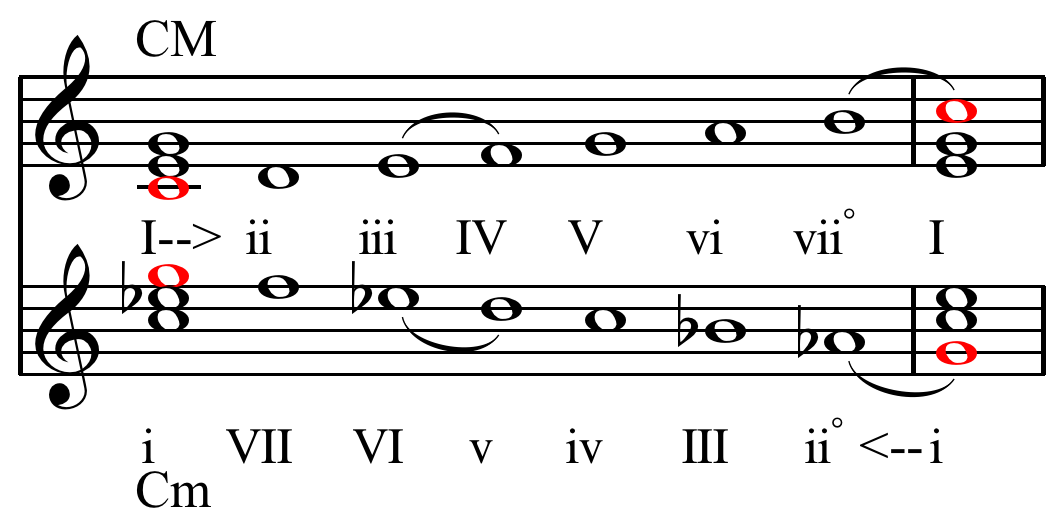
Illustration of Riemann's "dualist" system: minor as upside down major. Half steps are indicated by slur marks; other notes are separated by whole steps. The descending C melodic minor scale shown has the same order of half steps and whole steps as the ascending C major scale.

Riemannian theory, in general, refers to the musical theories of German theorist Hugo Riemann (1849–1919). His theoretical writings cover many topics, including musical logic, notation, harmony, melody, phraseology, the history of music theory, etc. More particularly, the term Riemannian theory often refers to his theory of harmony, characterized mainly by its dualism and by a concept of harmonic functions.

== Dualism ==
Riemann's "dualist" system for relating triads was adapted from earlier 19th-century harmonic theorists. The term "dualism" refers to the emphasis on the inversional relationship between major and minor, with minor triads being considered "upside down" versions of major triads; this "harmonic dualism" (harmonic polarity) is what produces the change-in-direction described above. See also the related term utonality.

== Transformations ==
In the 1880s, Riemann proposed a system of transformations that related triads directly to each other. Riemann's system had two classes of transformations: "Schritt" and "Wechsel". A Schritt transposed one triad into another, moving it a certain number of scale steps. For example, the "Quintschritt" (literally "five-step" in a mixture of Latin and German) transposed a triad by a perfect fifth, transforming C major into G major (up) or F major (down). A Wechsel inverted a triad according to the Riemann's theory of dualism, mapping a major triad to a minor triad. For example, Seitenwechsel ("die Seiten wechseln" translates as "to exchange sides") mapped a triad on to its parallel minor or major, transforming C major to C minor and conversely. Riemann's theory of transformations formed the basis for Neo-Riemannian theory, which expanded the idea of transformations beyond the basic tonal triads that Riemann was mostly concerned with.

== See also ==
- Schenkerian analysis
- Undertone series
