= Cyclic set =

Musical feature

In music, a cyclic set is a set, "whose alternate elements unfold complementary cycles of a single interval." Those cycles are ascending and descending, being related by inversion since complementary:

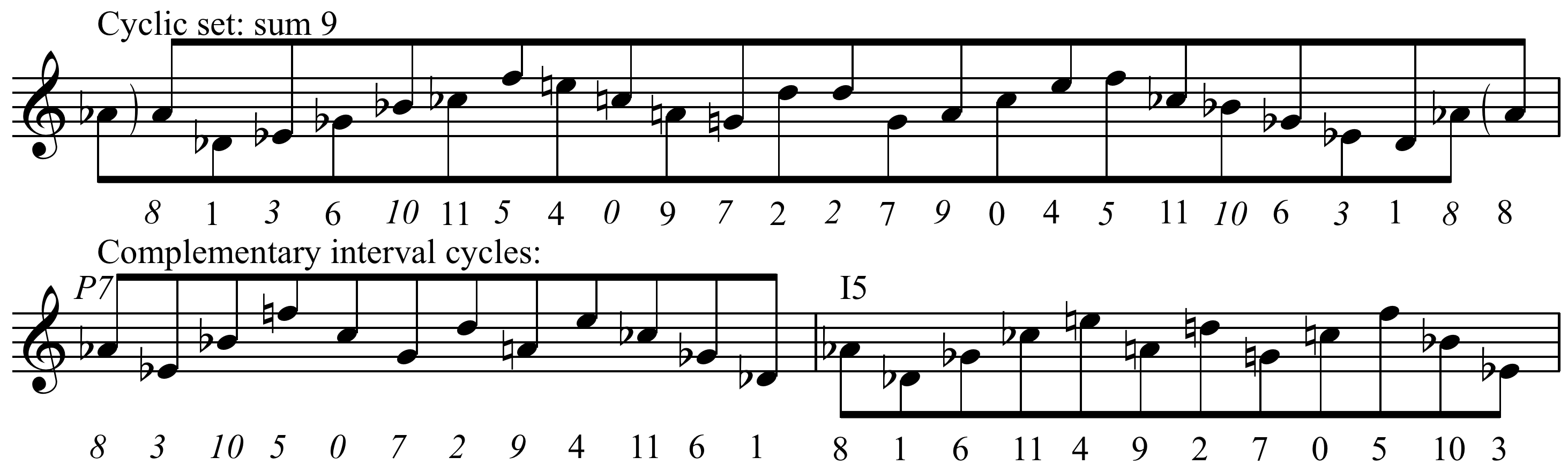
Cyclic set (sum 9) from Berg's Lyric Suite, and complementary interval cycles (P7 and I5) producing the cyclic set

In the above example, as explained, one interval (7) and its complement (-7 = +5), creates two series of pitches starting from the same note (8):

P7: 8 +7= 3 +7= 10 +7=  5...1 +7= 8
I5: 8 +5= 1 +5=  6 +5= 11...3 +5= 8

According to George Perle, "a Klumpenhouwer network is a chord analyzed in terms of its dyadic sums and differences," and, "this kind of analysis of triadic combinations was implicit in," his, "concept of the cyclic set from the beginning".

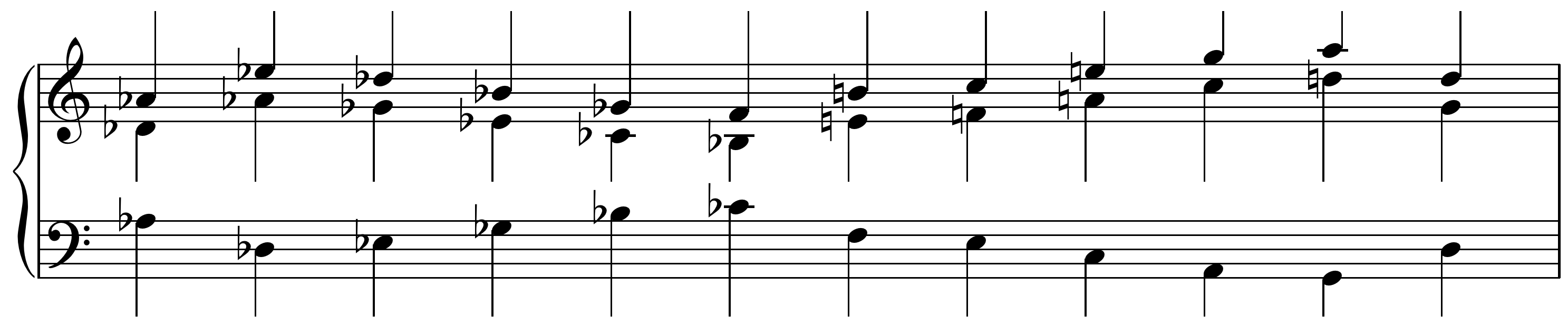
"Overlapping three-note segments," of the sum 9 cyclic set

A cognate set is a set created from joining two sets related through inversion such that they share a single series of dyads.

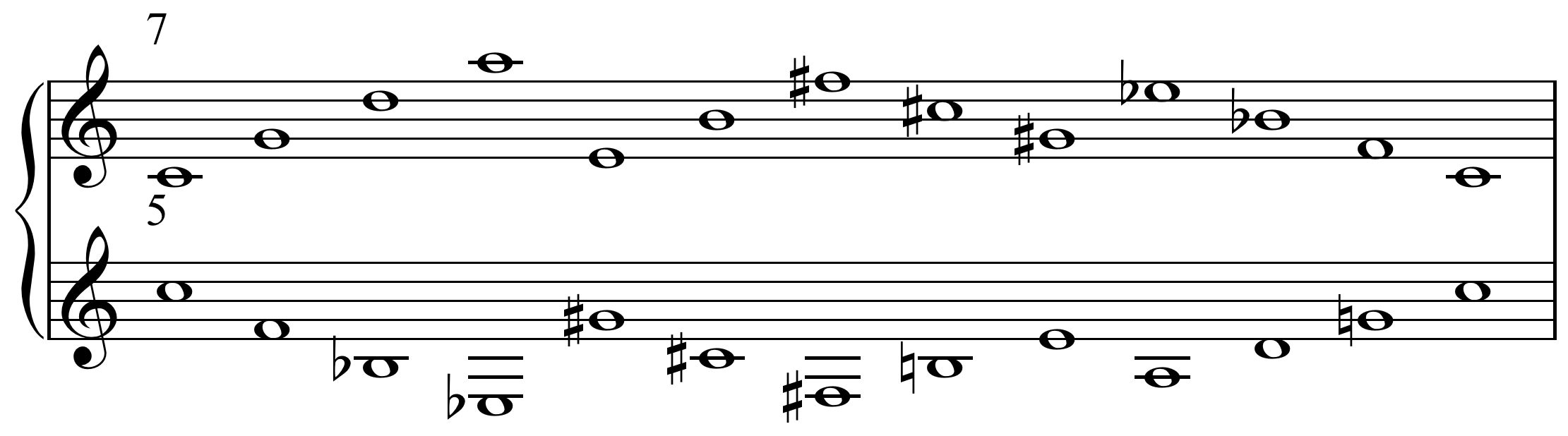
Cognate set created from paired interval-7 cycles of sum 0

  0  7  2  9  4 11  6  1  8  3 10  5 (0
+ 0  5 10  3  8  1  6 11  4  9  2  7 (0
________________________________________
= 0  0  0  0  0  0  0  0  0  0  0  0 (0

The two cycles may also be aligned as pairs of sum 7 or sum 5 dyads. All together these pairs of cycles form a set complex, "any cyclic set of the set complex may be uniquely identified by its two adjacency sums," and as such the example above shows p_{0}p_{7} and i_{5}i_{0}.
