= Journal of Music Theory =

- Discipline: Music
- Language: English

Publication details
- History: 1957–present
- Publisher: Duke University Press for the Yale Department of Music (United States)
- Frequency: Biannual

Standard abbreviations
- ISO 4: J. Music Theory

Indexing
- ISSN: 0022-2909 (print); 1941-7497 (web)
- JSTOR: jmusictheory

Links
- Journal homepage; Journal of Music Theory at Yale Department of Music

The Journal of Music Theory is a peer-reviewed academic journal specializing in music theory and analysis. It was established by David Kraehenbuehl (Yale University) in 1957.

According to its website, "[t]he Journal of Music Theory fosters conceptual and technical innovations in abstract, systematic musical thought and cultivates the historical study of musical concepts and compositional techniques. The journal publishes research with important and broad applications in the analysis of music and the history of music theory as well as theoretical or metatheoretical work that engages and stimulates ongoing discourse in the field. While remaining true to its original formalist outlook, the journal also addresses the influences of philosophy, mathematics, computer science, cognitive sciences, and anthropology on music theory."

The journal is edited by Richard Cohn. It has a long and distinguished history of past editors, including Allen Forte.
