= David Lewin =

American music theorist (1933–2003)

David Benjamin Lewin (July 2, 1933 – May 5, 2003) was an American music theorist, music critic and composer. Called "the most original and far-ranging theorist of his generation", he did his most influential theoretical work on the development of transformational theory, which involves the application of mathematical group theory to music.

== Biography ==
Lewin was born in New York City and studied piano from a young age and was for a time a pupil of Eduard Steuermann. He graduated from Harvard in 1954 with a degree in mathematics. Lewin then studied theory and composition with Roger Sessions, Milton Babbitt, Edward T. Cone, and Earl Kim at Princeton University, earning an M.F.A. in 1958. He returned to Harvard as a Junior Fellow in the Harvard Society of Fellows from 1958 to 1961.

After holding teaching positions at the University of California, Berkeley (1961–67), the State University of New York at Stony Brook (1967–79), and Yale University (1979–85), Lewin returned to Harvard as the Walter W. Naumburg Professor of Music in 1985. Lewin was a Guggenheim Foundation Fellowship grantee in 1983–84, served as the president of the Society for Music Theory from 1985 to 1988, and was a member of the American Academy of Arts and Sciences. He received honorary doctoral degrees from the University of Chicago in 1995, from the New England Conservatory of Music in 2000, and posthumously from Marc Bloch University in 2006.

== Theory ==
David Lewin's work in music theory was both influential and eclectic. Broadly, his writings can be divided into three overlapping groups: formal or mathematically based theory, more interpretive writing on the interaction of music and text, and metatheoretical discussions on the methodology and purpose of contemporary music theory.

The first group includes his innovations in transformational theory, as expressed in numerous articles and in his treatise Generalized Musical Intervals and Transformations. In this work, Lewin applied group theory to music, investigating the basic concepts, interval and transposition, and extending them beyond their traditional application to pitch. Based on a powerful metaphor of musical space, this theory can be applied to pitch, rhythm and metre, or even timbre. Moreover, it can be applied to both tonal and atonal repertories.

Lewin's writing on the relationship between text and music in song and opera involves composers from Mozart and Wagner to Schoenberg and Babbitt. In one interesting example, "Music Analysis as Stage Direction", he discusses how structural aspects of the music can suggest dramatic interpretations.

Important writings for the discipline of music theory include "Behind the Beyond" (1968–69), a response to Edward T. Cone, and "Music Theory, Phenomenology, and Modes of Perception" (1986). Lewin also undertakes considerable methodological and disciplinary reflection in writings that are chiefly oriented around other claims. This aspect of Lewin's intellectual style is evident as early as "A Theory of Segmental Association in Twelve-Tone Music" (1962).

Lewin often makes clear which dense sections can be skipped by readers unfamiliar with mathematics, and connects his abstract theory to practical musical considerations, such as performance and music perception. For example, in Musical Form and Transformation: Four Analytic Essays, he provides ear-training exercises to develop an ability to hear more difficult musical relationships. Posthumously, in 2003, a symposium on Lewin's theories was held at the Mannes Institute for Advanced Studies in Music Theory. Lewin's papers are now held at the Library of Congress.

== Criticism ==
Lewin's theoretical work may best be understood against his background in 1950/60s avant-garde compositional circles on the North American East Coast. Most of those composers, such as Babbitt, Benjamin Boretz, and Edward T. Cone, were also music critics and theorists/analysts. During the late 1970s, Lewin's work in this area became more explicitly concerned with issues in literary theory; he published articles in 19th-Century Music. Studies in Music with Text, published posthumously, demonstrates Lewin's concerns in this area while also synthesizing his critical/theoretical methods.

== Composition ==
While Lewin is primarily known as a theorist, he was also an active composer who wrote works for a wide range of forces, from solo voice to full orchestra. In 1961, he became the first professional musician to compose a computer-generated piece at Bell Laboratories.

== Publications ==
- "Re Intervallic Relations Between Two Collections of Notes." Journal of Music Theory 3/2 (1959): 298–301.
- "The Intervallic Content of a Collection of Notes, Intervallic Relations between a Collection of Notes and its Complement: an Application to Schoenberg's Hexachordal Pieces." Journal of Music Theory 4/1 (1960): 98–101.
- "A Metrical Problem in Webern's Op. 27." Journal of Music Theory 6/1 (1962): 125–132.
- "A Theory of Segmental Association in Twelve-Tone Music." Perspectives of New Music 1/1 (Fall 1962): 89–116.
- "Berkeley. Arnold Elston Quartet. Seymour Shifrin Quartet No. 2." Review in Perspectives of New Music 2/2 (Fall–Winter 1964): 169–175.
- "Communication on the Invertibility of the Hexachord." Perspectives of New Music 4/1 (Fall–Winter 1965): 182–186.
- "Is it Music?" Proceedings, First Annual Conference of the American Society of University Composers (1966): 50–53, on computer music.
- "Congruence-Invariant Measures in Uniform Spaces." Transactions of the American Mathematical Society 124/3 (1966): 50–53.
- "On Certain Techniques of Re-Ordering in Serial Music." Journal of Music Theory 10/2 (1966): 276–287.
- "A Study of Hexachord Levels in Schoenberg's Violin Fantasy." Perspectives of New Music 6/1 (Fall–Winter 1967): 18–32.
- "Moses und Aron: Some General Remarks, and Analytic Notes for Act I, Scene I." Perspectives of New Music 6/1 (Fall–Winter1967): 18–32; reprinted in The Garland Library of the History of Western Music, ed. E. Rosand, 12 (New York, 1965): 327–343.
- "Inversional Balance as an Organizing Force in Schoenberg's Music and Thought." Perspectives of New Music: 6/2 (Spring–Summer 1968): 1–21.
- "Some Applications of Communication Theory to the Study of Twelve-Tone Music." Journal of Music Theory, 12 (1968): 50–84.
- "Some Musical Jokes in Mozart's Le Nozze di Figaro." In Studies in Music History: Essays for Oliver Strunk, edited by Harold Powers, 443–447; reprinted in "Figaro's Mistakes". Current Musicology, no. 57 (1995), 45–60; reprinted in Studies in Music with Text,. Oxford and New York: Oxford University Press, 2006.
- "Behind the Beyond: A Response to Edward T. Cone". Perspectives of New Music 7/2 (Spring–Summer 1969), 59–69.
- "Toward the Analysis of a Schoenberg Song—Op. 15 No. 1", Perspectives of New Music 12/1–2 (Fall–Winter 1973/Spring–Summer 1974), 43–86.
- "On Partial Ordering", Perspectives of New Music 14/2–15/1 (Spring–Summer/Fall–Winter 1976), 252–257.
- "On the Interval Content of Invertible Hexachords", Journal of Music Theory 20/2 (1976), 185–188.
- "A Label-Free Development for 12-PC Systems", Journal of Music Theory 21/1 (1977), 29–48.
- "Some Notes on Schoenberg's Op. 11", In Theory Only 3/1 (1977), 3–7.
- "Forte's Interval Vector, My Interval Function, and Regener's Common-Note Function", Journal of Music Theory, 21 (1977), 194–237.
- "A Communication on Some Combinational Problems". Perspectives of New Music 16/2 (Spring–Summer 1978), 251–254.
- "Two Interesting Passages in Rameau's Traité de l'harmonie". In Theory Only 4/3 (1978), 3–11.
- "A Response to a Response On PCSet Relatedness". Perspectives of New Music 18/1-2 (Fall–Winter 1979/Spring–Summer 1980), 498–502.
- "On Generalized Intervals and Transformations". Journal of Music Theory 24/2 (1980), 243–251.
- "Some New Constructs Involving Abstract PCSets, and Probabilistic Applications". Perspectives of New Music 18/1–2 (Fall–Winter 1979/Spring–Summer 1980), 433–444.
- "Some Investigations into Foreground Rhythmic and Metric Patterning". In Music Theory: Special Topics, edited by Richmond Browne, 101–137. New York: Academic Press, 1981.
- "On Harmony and Meter in Brahms's Op. 76 No. 8". 19th-Century Music 4/3 (1981), 261–265.
- "A Way into Schoenberg's Opus 15, Number 7". In Theory Only 6/1 (1981) 3–24.
- "Comment: "On Joel Lester, 'Simultaneity Structures and Harmonic Functions in Tonal Music', In Theory Only 5/5: 3–28, and Marion Guck, 'Musical images as Musical Thoughts: The Contribution of Metaphor to Analysis', In Theory Only 5/5: 29–42". In Theory Only 5/8 (1981) 12–14.
- "Vocal Meter in Schoenberg's Atonal Music, with a Note on a Serial Hauptstimme". In Theory Only, 6/4 (1982), 12–36.
- "A Formal Theory of Generalized Tonal Functions". Journal of Music Theory 26 (1982), 23–60.
- "An Example of Serial Technique in Early Webern". Theory and Practice 7/1 (1982) 40–43.
- "On Extended Z-triples", Theory and Practice. 7/1 (1982) 38–39.
- "Auf dem Flusse: Image and Background in a Schubert Song", 19th-Century Music 6 (1982–3), 47–59; revised as Auf dem Flusse ... Schubert: Critical and Analytical Studies, edited by W. Frisch, 126–152. Lincoln: University of Nebraska Press, 1986.
- "Transformational Techniques in Atonal and Other Music Theories", Perspectives of New Music 21 (Fall–Winter 1982/Spring–Summer 1983), 312–371.
- "Brahms, His Past, and Modes of Music Theory", Brahms Studies: Washington DC 1983, 13–27.
- "An Interesting Global Rule for Species Counterpoint". In Theory Only 6/8 (1983), 19–44.
- "Amfortas's Prayer to Titurel and the role of D in Parsifal: the Tonal Spaces of the Drama and the Enharmonic C♭/B", 19th-Century Music 7 (1983–84), 336–349.
- "Studying with Roger", Perspectives of New Music 23/2 (1982–83), 152–154.
- "On Formal Intervals between Time-Spans". Music Perception 1/4 (1984), 414–423
- "On Ellwood Derr's 'Deeper Examination of Mozart's 1-2-4-3 Theme.'" In Theory Only 8/6 (1985), 3.
- Generalized Musical Intervals and Transformations. New Haven, CT, and London: Yale University Press, 1987. Reprinted, Oxford and New York: Oxford University Press, 2007.
- "On the 'ninth-chord in fourth inversion' from Verklärte Nacht", Journal of the Arnold Schoenberg Institute, 10/1 (1987) 45–64.
- "Concerning the inspired revelation of F. J. Fétis", Theoria 2 (1987) 1–12.
- "Some Instances of Parallel Voice-Leading in Debussy", 19th-Century Music 11 (1987–88), 59–72.
- "Klumpenhouwer Networks and Some Isographies That Involve Them", Music Theory Spectrum 12 (1990), 83–120.
- "Musical Analysis as Stage Direction", Music and Text: Critical Inquiries, ed. S. P. Scher (Cambridge, 1992), 163–176.
- "Women's Voices and the Fundamental Bass", Journal of Musicology 10 (1992), 464–482.
- "Some Notes on Analyzing Wagner: The Ring and Parsifal", 19th-Century Music 16 (1992–93), 49–58.
- "A Metrical Problem in Webern's Op. 27", Music Analysis 12 (1993), 343–354.
- Musical Form and Transformation: Four Analytic Essays. New Haven, Connecticut, and London: Yale University Press, 1993; reprinted, Oxford and New York: Oxford University Press, 2007.
- "A Tutorial on Klumpenhouwer Networks, Using the Chorale in Schoenberg's Opus 11 No.2", Journal of Music Theory 38 (1994), 79–101.
- "Comment on John Roeder's article", Music Theory Online 0/6 (1994).
- "Generalized Interval Systems for Babbitt's Lists, and for Schoenberg's String Trio", Music Theory Spectrum 17 (1995), 81–118.
- "Cohn Functions", Journal of Music Theory 40 (1996), 181–216.
- "Some Notes on Pierrot Lunaire". In Music Theory in Concept and Practice, ed. J. M. Baker, David W. Beach, and Jonathan W. Bernard. University of Rochester Press 1997, 433–457.
- "Conditions Under Which, in a Commutative GIS, Two 3-Element Sets Can Span the Same Assortment of GIS-Intervals; Notes on the Non-Commutative GIS in This Connection", Integral 11 (1997) 37–66
- "The D major Fugue Subject from WTCII: Spatial Saturation?", Music Theory Online 4/4 (1998).
- "Some Notes on the Opening of the F♯ Fugue from WTCI", Journal of Music Theory, 42/2 (1998), 235–239.
- "Some Ideas about Voice-Leading Between PCSETS", Journal of Music Theory, 42/1 (1998), 15–72.
- "All Possible GZ-Related 4-Element Pairs of Sets, in All Possible Commutative Groups, Found and Categorized", Integral 14–15 (2000–2001) 77–120.
- "Special Cases of the Interval Function Between Pitch-Class Sets X and Y", Journal of Music Theory, 42/2 (2001), 1–29.
- "Thoughts on Klumpenhouwer Networks and Perle-Lansky Cycles", Music Theory Spectrum, 45/1 (2002), 196–230.
- "The Form of Rhythm, the Rhythm of Form." In The Philosophical Horizon of Composition in the Twentieth Century, ed. Gianmario Borio. Venice: Fondazione Ugo e Olga Levi, 2003.
- "Some Compositional Uses of Projected Geometry", Perspectives of New Music, 42/2 (Summer 2004), 12–65.
- "Some Theoretical Thoughts about Aspects of Harmony in Mahler's Symphonies." In Music and the Aesthetics of Modernity: Essays, ed. Karol Berger, and Anthony Newcomb. Cambridge: Harvard University Press, 2005.
- Studies in Music and Text. New York: Oxford University Press, 2006.

== See also ==
- Transformational theory
