= Hugo Riemann =

German musicologist (1849–1919)

(Karl Wilhelm Julius) Hugo Riemann
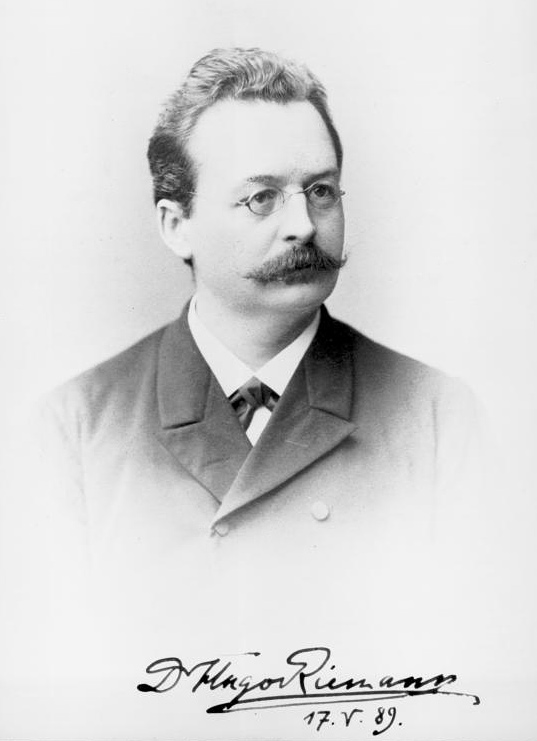
- Hugo Riemann (Hamburg, 1889)
- Born: Karl Wilhelm Julius Hugo Riemann; 18 July 1849; Grossmehlra (Sondershausen), German Confederation
- Died: 10 July 1919 (aged 69); Leipzig, Weimar Republic

Karl Wilhelm Julius Hugo Riemann (18 July 1849 – 10 July 1919) was a German musicologist and composer who was among the founders of modern musicology. The leading European music scholar of his time, he was active and influential as both a music theorist and music historian. Many of his contributions are now termed as Riemannian theory, a variety of related ideas on many aspects of music theory.

== Biography ==
Riemann was born at Grossmehlra, Schwarzburg-Sondershausen.

His first musical training came from his father Robert Riemann, a land owner, bailiff and, to judge from locally surviving listings of his songs and choral works, an active music enthusiast. Hugo Riemann was educated by Heinrich Frankenberger, the Sondershausen Choir Master, in Music theory. He was taught the piano by August Barthel and Theodor Ratzenberger (who had once studied under Liszt). He graduated from the gymnasiums at Sondershausen and Arnstadt.

Riemann studied law and finally philosophy and history at Berlin and Tübingen. After participating in the Franco-Prussian War he decided to devote his life to music, and studied accordingly at the Leipzig Conservatory. He then went to Bielefeld for some years as a teacher and conductor, but in 1878 returned to Leipzig as a visiting professor ("Privatdozent") at the University.

As a much-desired appointment at the Conservatory did not materialize, Riemann went to Bromberg in 1880, but 1881–90 he was a teacher of piano and theory at Hamburg Conservatory. After a short time at the Sondershausen Conservatory, he held a post in the conservatory at Wiesbaden (1890–95). He eventually returned to Leipzig University as lecturer in 1895. In 1901, he was appointed professor, and in 1914 he was made Director of the Institute of Musicology.

Eight days before he would have turned 70, he died of jaundice.

== Writings ==
Riemann is one of the most influential music theorists. In his publications and lectures he coined various terms which are still in everyday use, such as functional harmony (therein popular terms such as the tonic, the dominant, the subdominant and the parallel). In addition, the term and theory of the metric and rhythmic phrase, a basic element of today's music education, originate in Riemann.

Among his best-known works are the Musik-Lexikon (1882; 5th ed. 1899; Eng. trans., 1893–96), a complete dictionary of music and musicians, the Geschichte der musiktheorie im IX.-XIX. jahrhundert(1898), a history of music theory in Europe through the 19th century, the Handbuch der Harmonielehre, a work on the study of harmony, and the Lehrbuch des Contrapunkts, a similar work on counterpoint, all of which have been translated into English.

The Geschichte was widely used among lecturers of music for around half a century after it was written. In his book, he meticulously documented the development of polyphonic theory from the ancient times to the 16th century. With this, he concluded that common intervals heard in polyphonic music were used intuitively in folk practices due to the ostensibly "natural" element of these intervals. As he developed as a theorist, he focused more and more on human nature, using psychology as the basis of his ideas. His philosophical background exposed him to Pitagorean musical philosophy, which states that the natural harmony of the macrocosmos, or the world outside, is reflected in the microcosmos, or the world inside. The feelings generated by sounds and chords are just an intuitive rediscovery of a reality, a mathematical harmony, that is already there in the human being. Thus, what humans feel when hearing music is alike the acoustical phenomenon of sympathetic resonance.

He was an advocate of harmonic dualism, and his theory of harmonic function is the foundation of harmonic theory as it is still taught in Germany. He also elaborated a set of harmonic transformations that was adapted by the American theorist David Lewin, and eventually evolved into a significant strain of neo-Riemannian theory. Another pillar of modern neo-Riemannian theory, the Tonnetz, was not Riemann's own invention, but he played an important role in popularizing and disseminating it.

He authored many works on many different branches of music. His pupils included the German composer, pianist, organist, and conductor Max Reger and the musicologist and composer Walter Niemann.

== Compositions ==
He wrote many pieces for piano, songs, a piano sonata, six sonatinas, a violin sonata, and a string quartet.

== Riemannian theory ==
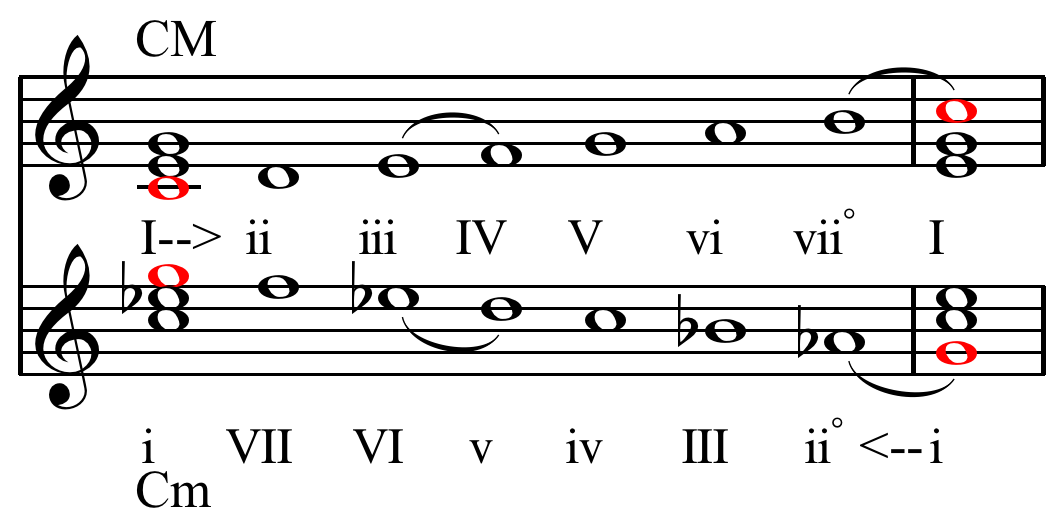
Illustration of Riemann's "dualist" system: minor as upside down major. Half steps are indicated by slur marks; other notes are separated by whole steps. The descending C melodic minor scale shown has the same order of half steps and whole steps as the ascending C major scale.

Riemannian theory, in general, refers to the musical theories of German theorist Hugo Riemann (1849–1919). His theoretical writings cover many topics, including musical logic, notation, harmony, melody, phraseology, the history of music theory, etc. More particularly, the term Riemannian theory often refers to his theory of harmony, characterized mainly by its dualism and by a concept of harmonic functions.

=== Neo-Riemannian theory ===
- Chordal space
- Functional harmony
- Modulatory space
- Neo-Riemannian theory
- Parallel and counter parallel
