= Richard Cohn =

American educator

Richard Cohn (born 1955) is a music theorist and Battell Professor Emeritus of Music Theory at Yale. He was previously chair of the department of music at the University of Chicago.

Early in his career, he focused on Béla Bartók's music and more recently on Neo-Riemannian theory, metric dissonance, equal divisions of the octave, and chromatic harmony. In 1994, he won the Society for Music Theory's Outstanding Publication Award for his article, "Transpositional Combination of Beat-Class Sets in Steve Reich's Phase-Shifting Music". In 1997, he won it for "Maximally Smooth Cycles, Hexatonic Systems, and the Analysis of Late-Romantic Triadic Progressions".

Cohn was the founding editor (2004–14) of Oxford Studies in Music Theory and is a former editor of Journal of Music Theory. He is the author of Audacious Euphony: Chromatic Harmony and the Triad's Second Nature (Oxford, 2012).

From 2025 to 2030 he is European Research Area chair in Music Analysis at the University of Coimbra, where his research group focuses on musical time and temporality.
