= List of chord progressions =

The following is a list of commonly used chord progressions in music.

Code
| Major | Major |
| Minor | Minor |
| Atonal | Atonal |
| Bitonal | Bitonal |
| Ind. | Indeterminate |
| PD | Phrygian dominant |
| Mix. | Mixolydian |

| Name | Image | Sound | # of chords | Quality |
|---|---|---|---|---|
| 50s progression | I–vi–IV–V | | 4 | Major |
| IV-V-I-vi | IV-V-I-vi progression in C major | | 4 | Major |
| I–V–vi–IV | I–V–vi–IV chord progression in C | | 4 | Major |
| I–IV–♭VII–IV | I–IV–♭VII–IV. | | 3 | Mix. |
| ii–V–I progression | ii–V–I | | 3 | Major |
| ii–V–I with tritone substitution (♭II7 instead of V7) | ii–♭II–I | | 3 | Major |
| ii-V-I with ♭III^{+} as dominant substitute | ii–♭III^{+}–I | | 3 | Mix. |
| vii^{o}^{7}/V–V–I (common in ragtime) | vii^{o}^{7}/V–V–I | | 3 | Major |
| Andalusian cadence | iv–III–♭II–I | | 4 | PD |
| Backdoor progression (front door is V7) | ii–♭VII I | | 3 | Major |
| Bird changes | I vii^{ø}–III7 vi–II7 v–I7, IV7 iv–♭VII7 iii–VI7 ♭iii–♭VI7, ii V7 I–VI7 ii–V | | 20 | Major |
| Chromatic descending 5–6 sequence | I–V–♭VII–IV | | 4 | Mix. |
| Circle progression | vi–ii–V–I | | 4 | Major |
| Coltrane changes | Coltrane changes in C: I–V/♭VI ♭VI–V/III III–V I. | | 6 | Major |
| Eight-bar blues | I–V–IV–IV–I–V–I–V | | 3 | Major |
| Folia | i–V–i–♭VII–♭III–♭VII–i–V–i–V–i–♭VII–♭III–♭VII–i–V–i | | 4 | Minor |
| Irregular resolution (Type I: Two common tones, two note moves by half step motion) | V7–III7 | | 2 | Major |
| Montgomery–Ward bridge | I–IV–ii–V | | 4 | Major |
| Omnibus progression | Omnibus progression. | | ? | Major |
| Pachelbel's Canon | I–V–vi–iii–IV–I–IV–V | | 5 | Major |
| Passamezzo antico | i–VII–i–V–III–VII–i–V–i | | 4 | Minor |
| Passamezzo moderno | I–IV–I–V–I–IV–I–V–I | | 3 | Major |
| Ragtime progression | III^{7}–VI^{7}–II^{7}–V^{7} | | 5 | Major |
| Rhythm changes | I-iv-ii-V / I-I^{7}-iv-I-V-I / III^{7}-VI^{7}-II^{7}-V^{7} | | 15 | Major |
| Romanesca | III–VII–i–V–III–VII–i–V–i | | 3 | Major |
| Sixteen-bar blues | I–I–I–I–I–I–I–I–IV–IV–I–I–V–IV–I–I | | 3 | Major |
| Stomp progression | IV7–#ivdim7–I7/5–I7–IV7–#ivdim7–I7/5–I7–IV7–#ivdim7–I7/5–V7/V/V–V7/V–V7–I7 | | 6 | Major |
| Twelve-bar blues | I–I–I–I–IV–IV–I–I–V–IV–I–V | | 3 | Major |
| I−vi−ii−V | I–vi–ii–V | | 4 | Major |
| ♭VII–V7 cadence | ♭VII–V–I | | 2–3 | Mix. |
| V–IV–I turnaround | V–IV–I | | 3 | Major |
| I–♭VII–♭VI–♭VII | I–♭VII–♭VI–♭VII | | 3 | Minor |
| IV^{△7}–V^{7}–iii^{7}–vi | IV^{△7}–V^{7}–iii^{7}–vi in C | | 4 | Major |
| ♭VI-♭VII-I | ♭VI - ♭VII - I | | 3 | Major |

== See also ==
- List of musical intervals
- List of pitch intervals
- List of musical scales and modes
- Cadence (music)
