= Approach chord =

Type of musical chord

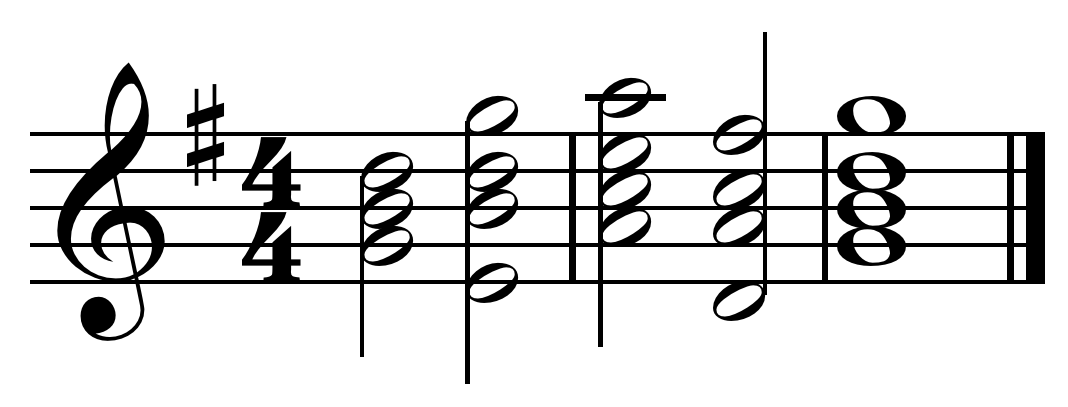
I-vi-ii-V turnaround in G.

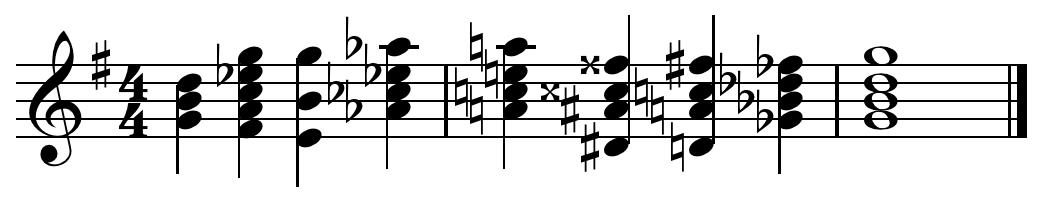
I-vi-ii-V turnaround with approach chords in G.

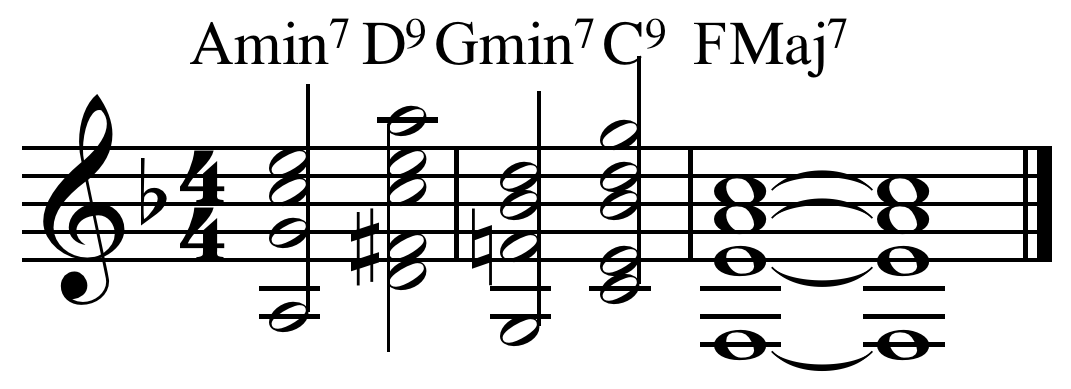
I-vi-ii-V turnaround in F.

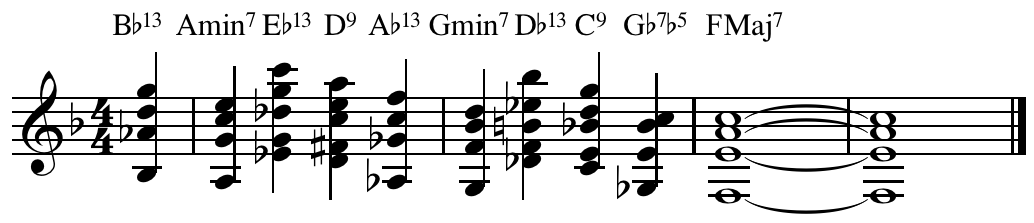
Approach chords in F.

In music, an approach chord (also chromatic approach chord and dominant approach chord) is a chord one half-step higher or lower than the goal, especially in the context of turnarounds and cycle-of-fourths progressions, for example the two bar 50s progression:

|G /  Em /   |Am /   D7 /   ||

may be filled in with approach chords:

|G F9 Em A♭m |Am D♯7 D7 G♭7 ||

F9 being the half-step to Em, A♭m being the half-step to Am, D♯7 being the half-step to D7, and G♭7 being the half-step to G. G being I, Em being vi, Am being ii, and D7 being V7 (see ii-V-I turnaround and circle progression).

An approach chord may also be the chord immediately preceding the target chord such as the subdominant (FMaj7) preceding the tonic (CMaj7) creating a strong cadence through the contrast of no more than two common tones: FACE – CEGB.

Approach chords may thus be a semitone or a fifth or fourth from their target.

Approach chords create the harmonic space of the modes in jazz rather than secondary dominants.

== See also ==
- Passing chord
- Predominant chord
- Tritone substitution
