= Chord progression =

Succession of musical chords

A IV–V–I progression in the key of C major. The chords shown are F major, G major, and C major.

In a musical composition, a chord progression or harmonic progression (informally chord changes, used as a plural, or simply changes) is a succession of chords. Chord progressions are the foundation of harmony in Western musical tradition from the common practice era of classical music to the 21st century. Chord progressions are the foundation of popular music styles (e.g., pop music, rock music), traditional music, as well as genres such as blues and jazz. In these genres, chord progressions are the defining feature on which melody and rhythm are built.

In tonal music, chord progressions have the function of either establishing or otherwise contradicting a tonality, the technical name for what is commonly understood as the "key" of a song or piece. Chord progressions, such as the extremely common chord progression I–V–vi–IV, are usually expressed by Roman numerals in classical music theory. In many styles of popular and traditional music, chord progressions are expressed using the name and "quality" of the chords. For example, the previously mentioned chord progression, in the key of E♭ major, would be written as E♭ major–B♭ major–C minor–A♭ major in a fake book or lead sheet. In the first chord, E♭ major, the "E♭" indicates that the chord is built on the root note "E♭" and the word "major" indicates that a major chord is built on this "E♭" note.

In rock and blues, musicians also often refer to chord progressions using Roman numerals, as this facilitates transposing a song to a new key. For example, rock and blues musicians often think of the 12-bar blues as consisting of I, IV, and V chords. Thus, a simple version of the 12-bar blues might be expressed as I–I–I–I, IV–IV–I–I, V–IV–I–I. By thinking of this blues progression in Roman numerals, a backup band or rhythm section could be instructed by a bandleader to play the chord progression in any key. For example, if the bandleader asked the band to play this chord progression in the key of B♭ major, the chords would be B♭–B♭–B♭–B♭, E♭–E♭–B♭–B♭, F–E♭–B♭–B♭.

The complexity of a chord progression varies from genre to genre and over different historical periods. Some pop and rock songs from the 1980s to the 2010s have fairly simple chord progressions. Funk emphasizes the groove and rhythm as the key element, so entire funk songs may be based on one chord. Some jazz-funk songs are based on a two-, three-, or four-chord vamp. Some punk and hardcore punk songs use only a few chords. On the other hand, bebop jazz songs may have 32-bar song forms with one or two chord changes every bar.

== Basic theory ==
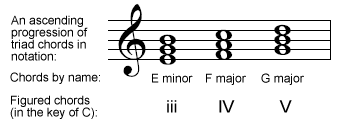
The key note, or tonic, of a piece of music is called note number one, the first step of (here), the ascending scale iii–IV–V. Chords built on several scale degrees are numbered likewise. Thus the chord progression E minor–F–G can be described as three–four–five, (or iii–IV–V).

A chord may be built upon any note of a musical scale. Therefore, a seven-note diatonic scale allows seven basic diatonic triads, each degree of the scale becoming the root of its own chord. A chord built upon the note E is an E chord of some type (major, minor, diminished, etc.) Chords in a progression may also have more than three notes, such as in the case of a seventh chord (V^{7} is particularly common, as it resolves to I) or an extended chord. The harmonic function of any particular chord depends on the context of the particular chord progression in which it is found.

=== Diatonic and chromatic chords ===
The diatonic harmonization of any major scale results in three major triads, which are based on the first, fourth, and fifth scale degrees. The triads are referred to as the tonic chord (in Roman numeral analysis, symbolized by "I"), the subdominant chord (IV), and the dominant chord, (V), respectively. These three triads include, and therefore can harmonize, every note of that scale. Many simple traditional music, folk music and rock and roll songs use only these three chord types (e.g. The Troggs' "Wild Thing", which uses I, IV and V chords).

The same major scale also has three minor chords, the supertonic chord (ii), mediant chord (iii), and submediant chord (vi), respectively. These chords stand in the same relationship to one another (in the relative minor key) as do the three major chords, so that they may be viewed as the first (i), fourth (iv) and fifth (v) degrees of the relative minor key. For example, the relative minor of C major is A minor, and in the key of A minor, the i, iv and v chords are A minor, D minor and E minor. In practice, in a minor key, the third of the dominant chord is often raised by one semitone to form a major chord (or a dominant seventh chord if the seventh is added).

In addition, the seventh degree of the major scale (i.e. the leading tone) forms a diminished chord (vii^{o}).

A chord may also have chromatic notes, that is, notes outside of the diatonic scale. Perhaps the most basic chromatic alteration in simple folk songs is the raised fourth degree (♯) that results when the third of the ii chord is raised one semitone. Such a chord typically functions as the secondary dominant of the V chord (V/V). In some instances, chromatic notes are introduced to modulate to a new key. This in turn may lead to a resolution back to the original key later on, so that the entire sequence of chords helps create an extended musical form and a sense of movement.

=== Progressions ===
Although there are many possible progressions, in practice, progressions are often limited to a few bars' lengths and certain progressions are favored above others. There is also a certain amount of fashion in which a chord progression is defined (e.g., the 12-bar blues progression) and may even help in defining an entire genre.

In western classical notation, chords are numbered with Roman numerals. Other types of chord notation have been devised, from figured bass to the chord chart. These usually allow or even require a certain amount of improvisation.

== Common progressions ==
=== Simple progressions ===
Diatonic scales such as the major and minor scales lend themselves particularly well to the construction of common chords because they contain many perfect fifths. Such scales predominate in those regions where harmony is an essential part of music, as, for example, in the common practice period of western classical music. In considering Arab and Indian music, where diatonic scales are used, there are also available a number of non-diatonic scales, the music has no chord changes, remaining always upon the key-chord, an attribute which has also been observed in hard rock, hip hop, funk, disco, jazz, etc.

Alternation between two chords may be thought of as the most basic chord progression. Many well-known pieces are built harmonically upon the mere repetition of two chords of the same scale. For example, many of the more straightforward melodies in classical music consist entirely or mostly of alternation between the tonic (I) and the dominant (V, sometimes with an added seventh), as do popular songs such as "Achy Breaky Heart". The Isley Brothers' "Shout" uses I–vi throughout.

=== Three-chord progressions ===
Three-chord progressions are more common since a melody may then dwell on any note of the scale. They are often presented as successions of four chords (as shown below), in order to produce a binary harmonic rhythm, but then two of the four chords are the same.

- I – IV – V – V
- I – I – IV – V
- I – IV – I – V
- I – IV – V – IV
- I – IV – V – I

Often the chords may be selected to fit a pre-conceived melody, but just as often it is the progression itself that gives rise to the melody.

Similar progressions abound in African popular music. They may be varied by the addition of sevenths (or other scale degrees) to any chord or by substitution of the relative minor of the IV chord to give, for example, I–ii–V. This sequence, using the ii chord, is also used cadentially in a common chord progression of jazz harmony, the so-called ii–V–I turnaround.

Three-chord progressions provide the harmonic foundation of much African and American popular music, and they occur sectionally in many pieces of classical music (such as the opening bars of Beethoven's Pastoral Symphony).

Where such a simple sequence does not represent the entire harmonic structure of a piece, it may readily be extended for greater variety. Frequently, an opening phrase has the progression I–IV–V–V, which ends on an unresolved dominant, may be "answered" by a similar phrase that resolves back onto the tonic chord, giving a structure of double the length:

I	IV	V	V
I	IV	V	I

Additionally, such a passage may be alternated with a different progression to give a simple binary or ternary form such as that of the popular 32-bar form (see musical form).

=== Blues changes ===
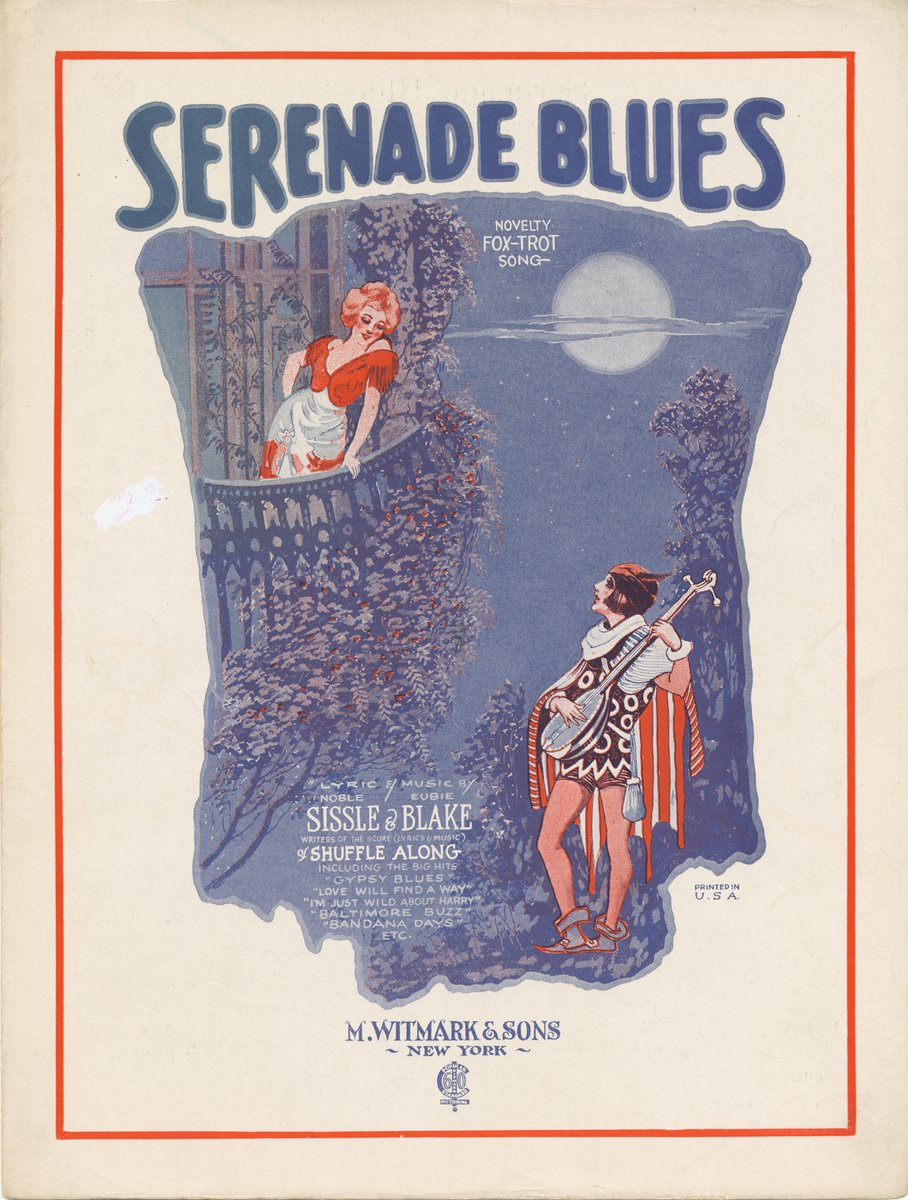
Blues progressions influenced a great deal of 20th century American popular music

The 12-bar blues and its many variants use an elongated, three-line form of the I–IV–V progression that has also generated countless hit records, including the most significant output of rock and rollers such as Chuck Berry and Little Richard. In its most elementary form (and there are many variants), the chord progression is

I	I	I	I
IV	IV	I	I
V	IV	I	I

Blues progressions have also been subjected to densely chromatic elaboration, as in the Bird blues.

Steedman (1984) proposed that a set of recursive rewrite rules generate all well-formed transformations of jazz, both basic blues chord changes and slightly modified sequences (such as the "rhythm changes"). Important transformations include:

- replacement of (or addition to) a chord with its dominant, subdominant or the tritone substitution.
- use of chromatic passing chords.
- extensively applying the ii–V–I turnaround.
- chord alterations such as minor chords, diminished sevenths, etc.

=== 1950s progression ===
A 50s progression in C

Another common way of extending the I–IV–V progression is by adding the chord of the sixth scale degree, giving the sequence I–vi–IV–V or I–vi–ii–V, sometimes called the 50s progression or doo-wop progression.

This progression had been in use from the earliest days of classical music and then generated popular hits such as Rodgers and Hart's "Blue Moon" (1934) and Hoagy Carmichael's "Heart and Soul" (1938).

Taken up into the pop mainstream, it continued to be used sectionally, as in the last part of The Beatles' "Happiness Is a Warm Gun".

=== Circle progressions ===
A circle progression in C major
The ragtime progression (E^{7}–A^{7}–D^{7}–G^{7}) often appears in the bridge of jazz standards. The III^{7}–VI^{7}–II^{7}–V^{7} (or V^{7}/V/V/V–V^{7}/V/V–V^{7}/V–V^{7}) leads back to C major (I) but is itself indefinite in key.

Introducing the ii chord into these progressions emphasises their appeal as constituting elementary forms of circle progression. These, named for the circle of fifths, consist of "adjacent roots in ascending fourth or descending fifth relationship—for instance, the sequence vi–ii–V–I ascends with each successive chord to one a fourth above the previous. Such a motion, based upon close harmonic relations, offers "undoubtedly the most common and the strongest of all harmonic progressions". Short cyclical progressions may be derived by selecting a sequence of chords from the series completing a circle from the tonic through all seven diatonic chords:

I–IV–vii^{o}–iii–vi–ii–V–I

This type of progression was much used by classical composers, who introduced increasingly subtle inflections. Particularly, substitution of major for minor chords giving, for example, I–VI–II–V allowed a more sophisticated chromaticism as well as the possibility of modulation. These harmonic conventions were taken up by American popular entertainers, giving rise to many variations on those harmonic staples of early jazz that have been dubbed the ragtime progression and the stomp progression. All such progressions may be found used sectionally, as for example in the much-used "rhythm changes" of George Gershwin's "I Got Rhythm".

== Harmonizing the scale ==
As well as the cyclical underpinning of chords, the ear tends to respond well to a linear thread; chords following the scale upwards or downwards. These are often referred to as step progressions because they follow the steps of the scale, making the scale itself a bassline. In the 17th century, descending bass lines found favour for "divisions on the ground", so that Pachelbel's canon contains very similar harmonizations of the descending major scale.

At its simplest, this descending sequence may simply introduce an extra chord, either III or V, into the I–vi–IV–V type of sequence described above. This chord allows the harmonization of the seventh degree, and so of the bass line I–VII–VI....

The finale measures of the first movement of Ravel's Piano Concerto in G feature the harmonization of a descending hybrid scale (phrygo-major). In this special case, Ravel used a parallel series of major triads (G F♯ E D C B♭ A♭ G).

== Minor and modal progressions ==
A typical Andalusian cadence por arriba (i.e. in A minor). G is the subtonic and G^{♯} is the leading tone.

Similar strategies to all the above, work equally well in minor modes: there have been one–, two–, and three–minor-chord songs, minor blues. A notable example of a descending minor chord progression is the four-chord Andalusian cadence, i–VII–VI–V.

Folk and blues tunes frequently use the Mixolydian scale, which has a flat seventh degree, altering the position of the three major chords to I–^{♭}VII–IV. For example, if the major scale of C, which gives the three chords C, F and G on the first, fourth and fifth degrees, is played with G as the tonic, then the same chords will now appear on the first, fourth, and seventh degrees. A common chord progression with these chords is I–♭VII–IV–I, which also can be played as I–I–♭VII–IV or ♭VII–IV–I–I.

The minor-third step from a minor key up to the relative major encouraged ascending scale progressions, particularly based on an ascending pentatonic scale. Typical of the type is the sequence i–III–IV (or iv)–VI.

According to Tom Sutcliffe:

... during 1960s some pop groups started to experiment with modal chord progressions as an alternative way of harmonizing blues melodies. ... This created a new system of harmony that has influenced subsequent popular music.

This came about partly from the similarity of the blues scale to modal scales and partly from the characteristics of the guitar and the use of parallel major chords on the pentatonic minor scale. With barre chords on guitar, the same chord shape can be moved up and down the neck without changing the fingering. This phenomenon is also linked to the rise in use of power chords in various sub-genres of rock music.

== See also ==
- Chromatic mediant
- Diatonic function
- Ear training
- List of chord progressions
- List of songs containing the 50s progression
- List of songs containing the I–V–vi–IV progression
- Montgomery-Ward bridge
- Passamezzo moderno
- Passing chord
- Root progressions
- Sequence (music)
- Twelve-bar blues
- Traditional sub-Saharan African harmony
