= Common chord (music) =

Chord that is shared by two keys

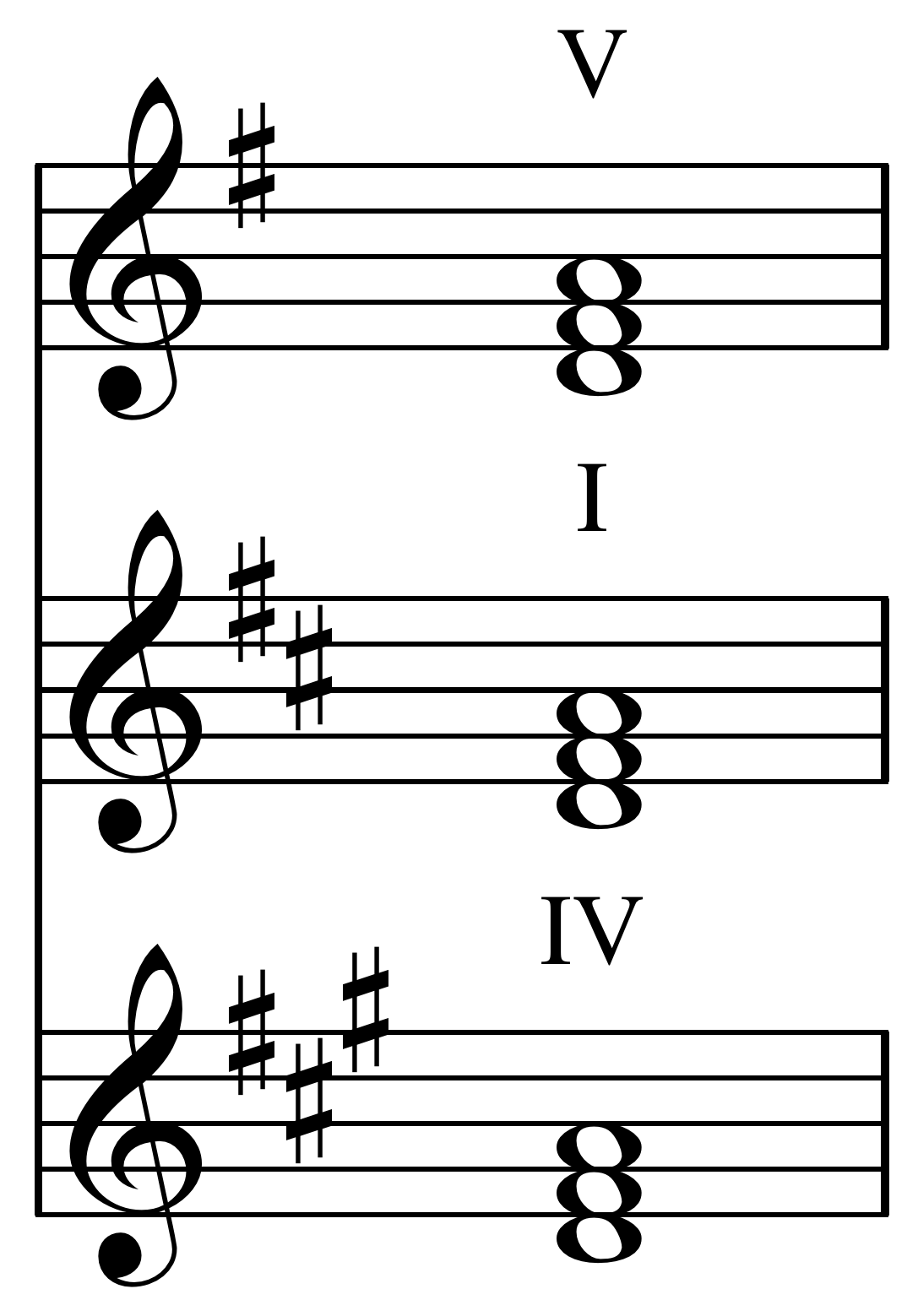
Common chord in the keys of G, D, and A major; as well as E, B, and F♯ minor.

In Western music theory, a common chord is a chord that is shared by (diatonic to) more than one key. A "common chord" may also be defined simply as a triadic chord (e.g., C–E–G), as one of the most commonly used chords in a key (I–IV–V–vi–ii–iii), more narrowly as a triad in which the fifth is perfect (i.e., a major or minor triad), in which sense it is alternatively referred to as a "perfect chord" or, more narrowly still (in American practice), as a major triad only.

Common chords are frequently used in modulations, in a type of modulation known as common chord modulation or diatonic pivot chord modulation. It moves from the original key to the destination key (usually a closely related key) by way of a chord both keys share. For example, G major and D major have 4 chords in common: G, Bm, D, Em. This can be easily determined by a chart similar to the one below, which compares chord qualities. The I chord in G major—a G major chord—is also the IV chord in D major, so I in G major and IV in D major are aligned on the chart.

C major:	V	vi	vii^{o}	I	ii	iii	IV
G major:	I	ii	iii	IV	V	vi	vii^{o}
D major:	IV	V	vi	vii^{o}	I	ii	iii

Any chord with the same root note and chord quality can be used as the "pivot chord." However, chords that are not generally found in the style of the piece (for example, major VII chords in a Bach-style chorale) are also not likely to be chosen as the pivot chord. The most common pivot chords are the predominant chords (ii and IV) in the new key. When analyzing a piece that uses this style of modulation, the common chord is labeled with its function in both the original and the destination keys, as it can be seen either way.

A chord is common to, or shared by, six keys: three major keys, and three relative minor keys. For example, a C major chord is contained in F, C, and G major as well as D, A, and E minor.

== Related keys ==
The number of diatonically occurring chords that two keys share is a measure of how closely related they are. A closely related key can be defined as one that has many common chords. A relative major or minor key has all of its chords in common; a dominant or subdominant key has four in common. Less closely related keys have two or fewer chords in common.

For example, C major and A minor have 7 common chords while C major and F♯ major have 0 common chords.

C	CEG	DFA	EGB	FAC	GBD	ACE	BDF
F	CEG	DFA	~~EGB♭~~	FAC	~~GB♭D~~	ACE	~~B♭DF~~
G	CEG	~~DF♯A~~	EGB	~~F♯AC~~	GBD	ACE	~~BDF♯~~
D	~~C♯EG~~	~~DF♯A~~	EGB	~~F♯AC♯~~	GBD	~~AC♯E~~	~~BDF♯~~
B♭	~~CE♭G~~	DFA	~~E♭GB♭~~	FAC	~~GB♭D~~	~~ACE♭~~	~~B♭DF~~

== See also ==
- Enharmonic scale
- Common tone (chord)
- Common tone (scale)
