= Predominant chord =

Musical term

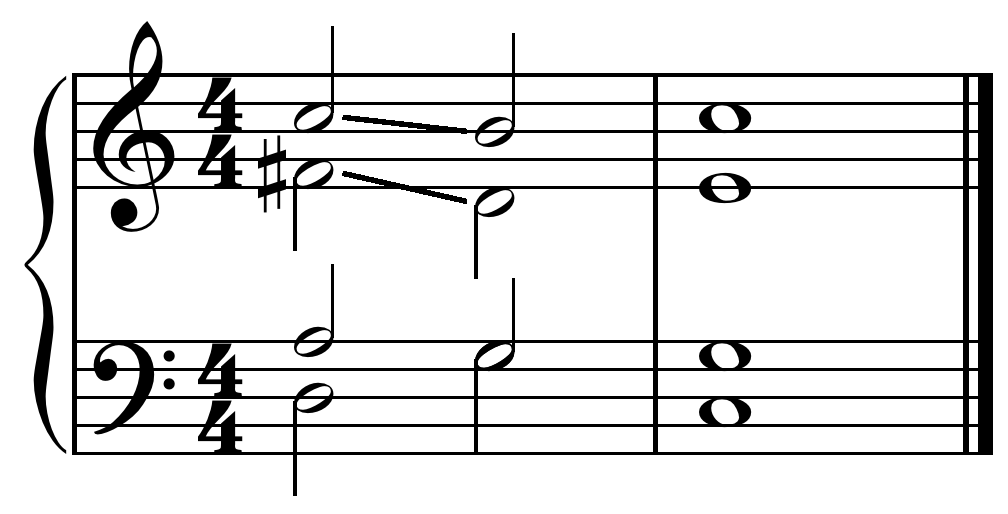
V of V in C, four-part harmony.

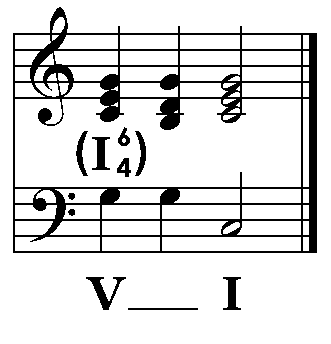
A cadential ${}_4^6$ progression showing I^{6}_{4} as a predominant chord.

In music theory, a predominant chord (also pre-dominant) is any chord with predominant (subdominant) function, normally resolving to a dominant chord. Examples of predominant chords are the subdominant (IV, iv), supertonic (ii, ii°), Neapolitan sixth and German sixth. Other examples are the secondary dominant (V/V) and secondary leading tone chord. Predominant chords may lead to secondary dominants. Predominant chords both expand away from the tonic and lead to the dominant, affirming the dominant's pull to the tonic. Thus they lack the stability of the tonic and the drive towards resolution of the dominant. The predominant harmonic function is part of the fundamental harmonic progression of many classical works. The submediant (vi) may be considered a predominant chord or a tonic substitute.

The dominant preparation is a chord or series of chords that precedes the dominant chord in a musical composition. Usually, the dominant preparation is derived from a circle of fifths progression. The most common dominant preparation chords are the supertonic, the subdominant, the V7/V, the Neapolitan chord (N^{6} or ♭II^{6}), and the augmented sixth chords (e.g., Fr^{+6}).

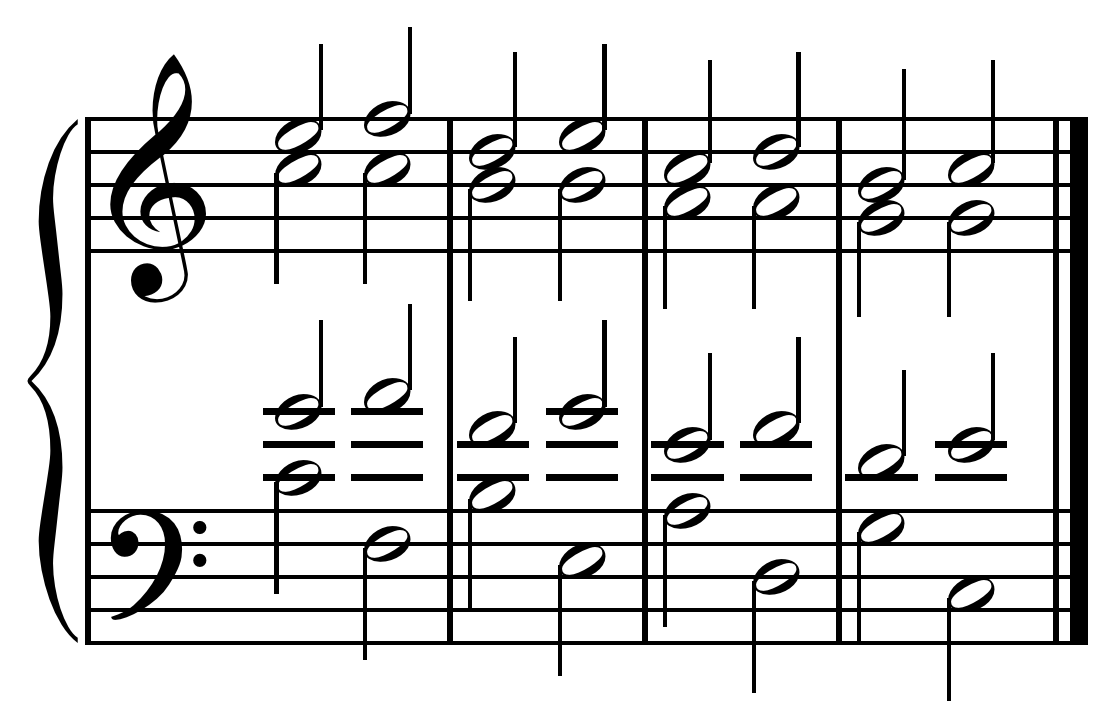
The circle progression features a series of chords derived from the circle of fifths preceding the dominant and tonic.

In sonata form, the dominant preparation is in the development, immediately preceding the recapitulation. Ludwig van Beethoven's sonata-form works generally have extensive dominant preparation — for example, in the first movement of the Sonata Pathétique, the dominant preparation lasts for 29 measures (mm. 169–197).

== List ==
- First inversion augmented mediant
  - ♭III^{+}^{6}_{3}
- Augmented dominant
  - V^{+}
- Augmented sixths
  - Fr^{4}_{3}
  - Ger^{6}_{5}
- Second inversion tonic
  - I^{6}_{4}
  - i^{6}_{4}
- Subdominant
  - IV
  - iv
- Submediant
  - vi, stepwise to dominant
- Supertonic and secondary dominant
  - ii
  - II (V/V)
  - ii^{o}
  - vii^{o}^{7}/V
  - ♭II^{6}

== Gallery ==
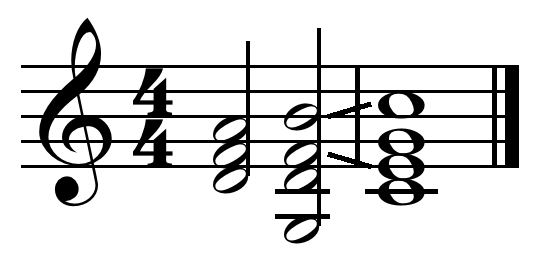
ii-V-I turnaround in C: the supertonic (Dm) leads to the dominant (G^{7}), which leads to the tonic (C).

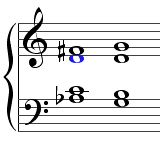
The French sixth chord; distinguishing tone highlighted in blue.

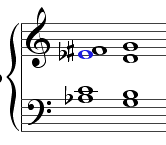
The German sixth; the distinguishing tone is highlighted in blue.

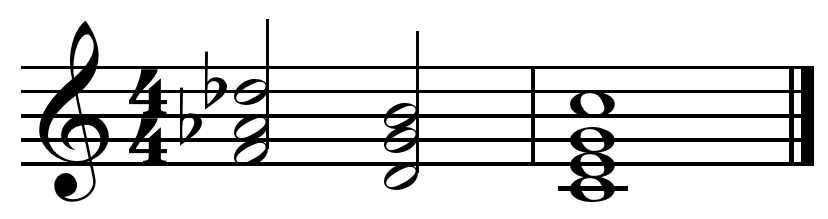
♭II^{6}–V^{6}_{4}–I or ( of IV–V–I progression as usual, without Neapolitan sixth chord in place of IV).

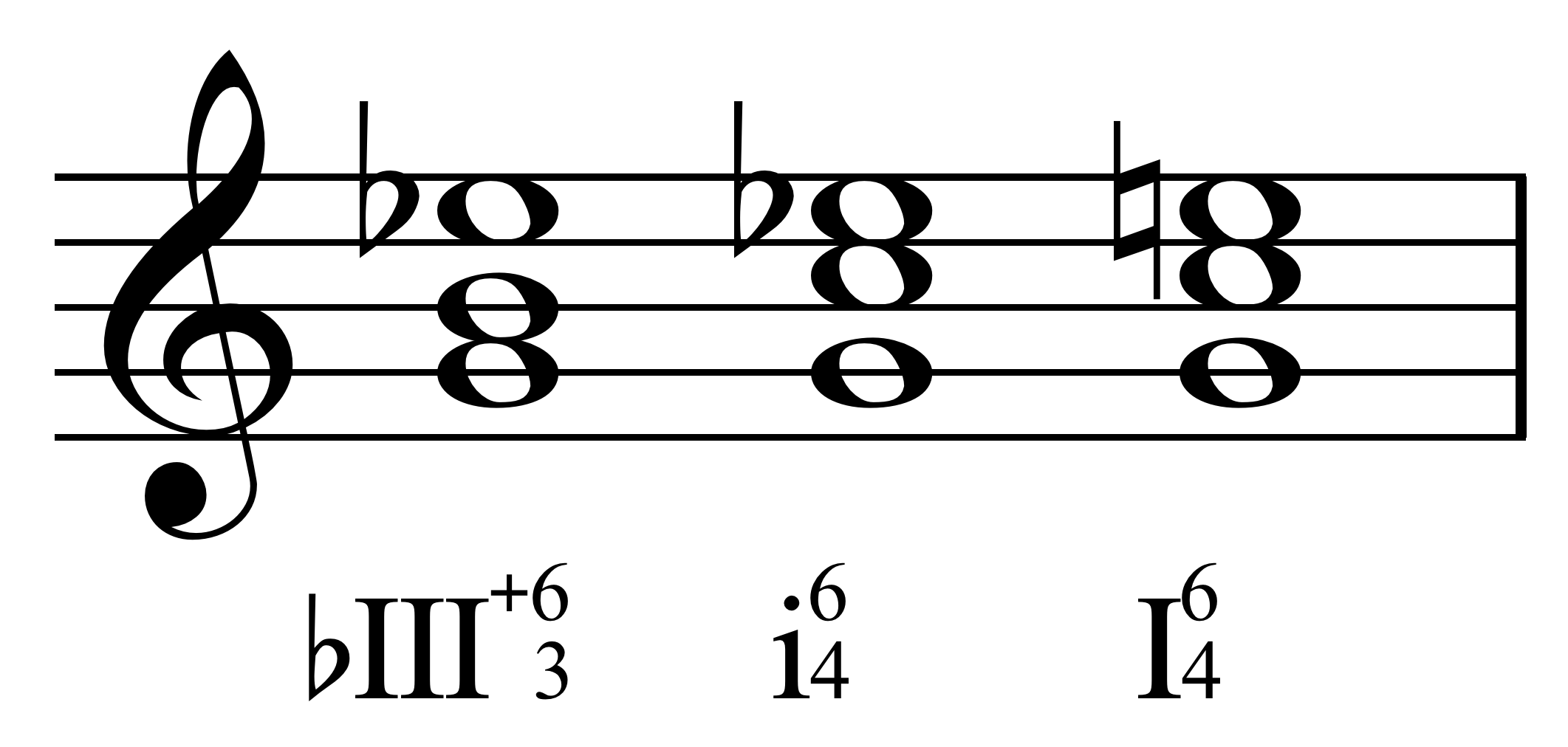
Three examples

== See also ==
- Approach chord
- Harmonic rhythm
- Passing chord
