= Modulation (music) =

Change from one tonality to another

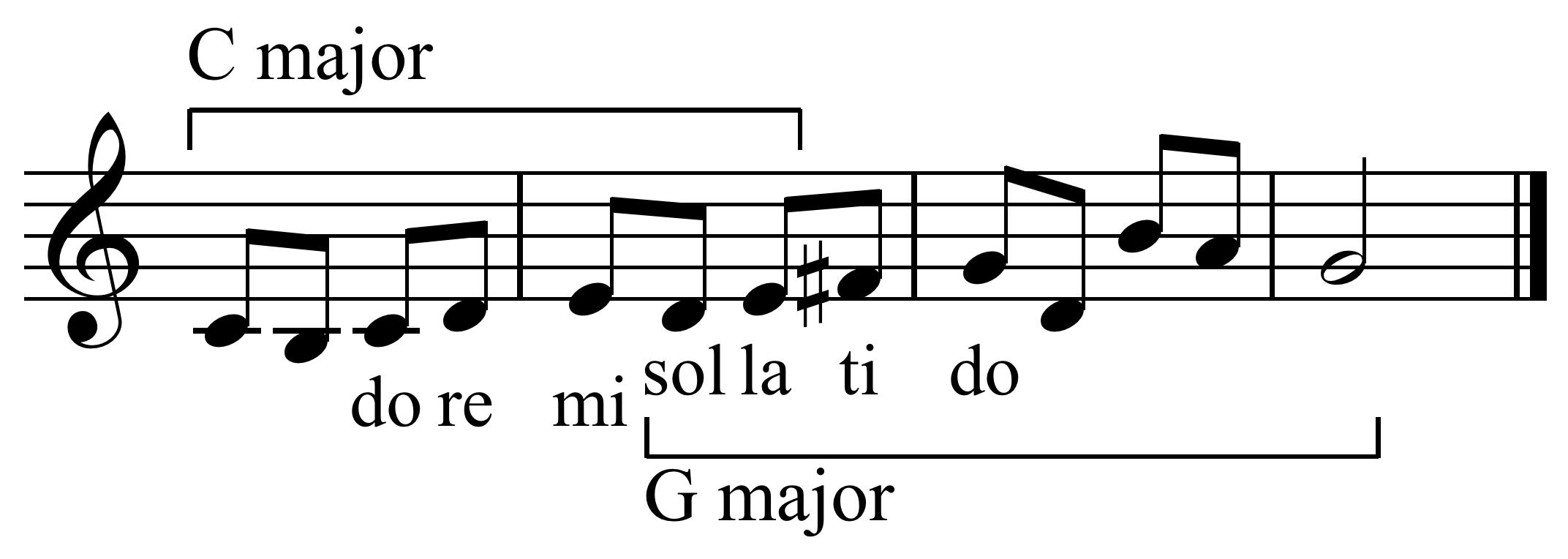
Example of modulation from the tonic to the dominant.

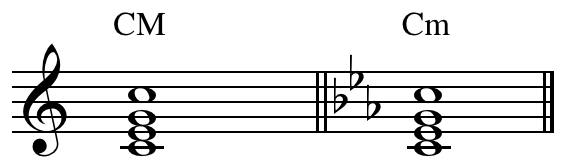
Key signature change example: C major to C minor.

In music, modulation is the change from one tonality (either a tonic or a mode, or both) to another. This may or may not be accompanied by a change in key signature (a key change). Modulations articulate or create the structure or form of many pieces, as well as add interest. Treatment of a non-tonic chord as a temporary tonic, for less than a phrase, is considered tonicization.

Modulation is the essential part of the art. Without it there is little music, for a piece derives its true beauty not from the large number of fixed modes which it embraces but rather from the subtle fabric of its modulation.

— Charles-Henri Blainville (1767)

== Requirements ==
- Harmonic: quasi-tonic, modulating dominant, pivot chord
- Melodic: recognizable segment of the scale of the quasi-tonic or strategically placed leading-tone
- Metric and rhythmic: quasi-tonic and modulating dominant on metrically accented beats, prominent pivot chord

The quasi-tonic is the tonic of the new key established by the modulation. The modulating dominant is the dominant of the quasi-tonic. The pivot chord precedes the modulating dominant, and is common to both the key of the immediately preceding tonic, and the new key of the quasi-tonic. For example, in a modulation to the dominant, ii/V–V/V–V could be a pivot chord, modulating dominant, and quasi-tonic.

== Types ==
=== Common-chord modulation ===
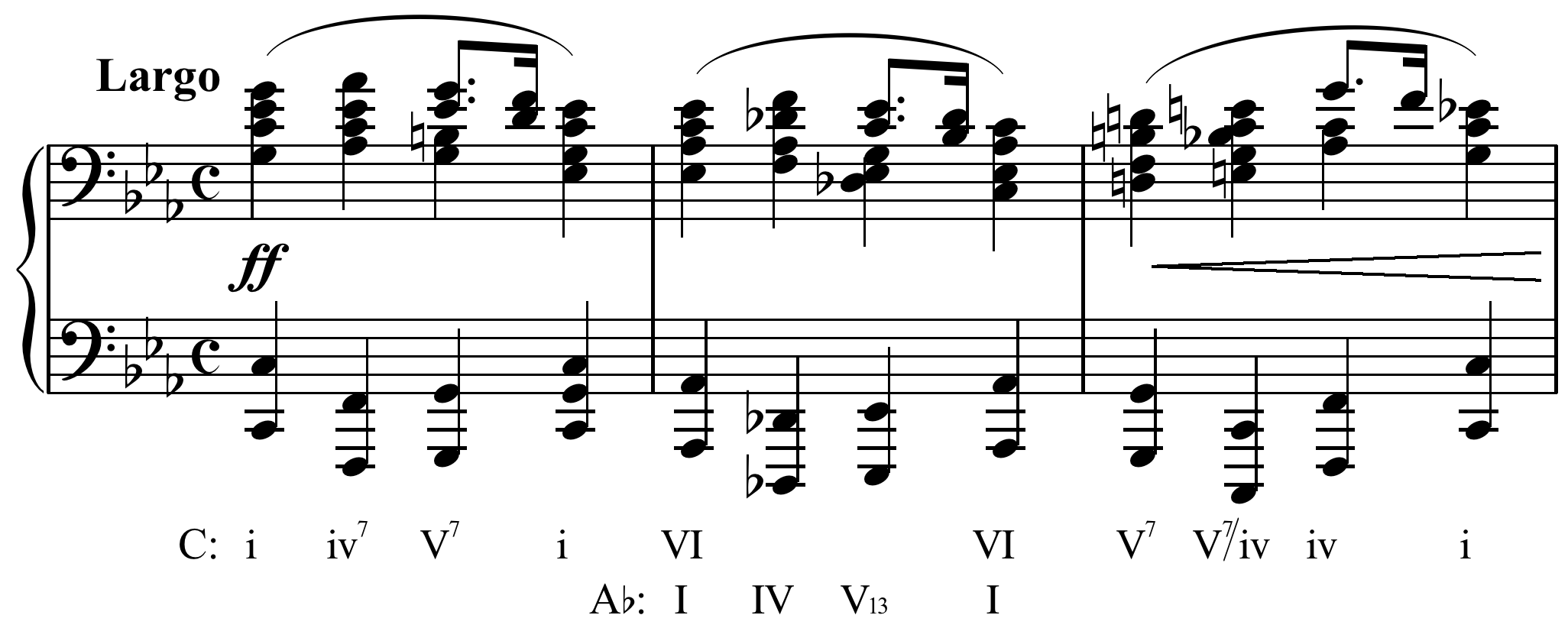
Common-chord modulation in the opening of Chopin's Prelude in C minor, Op. 28, No. 20.

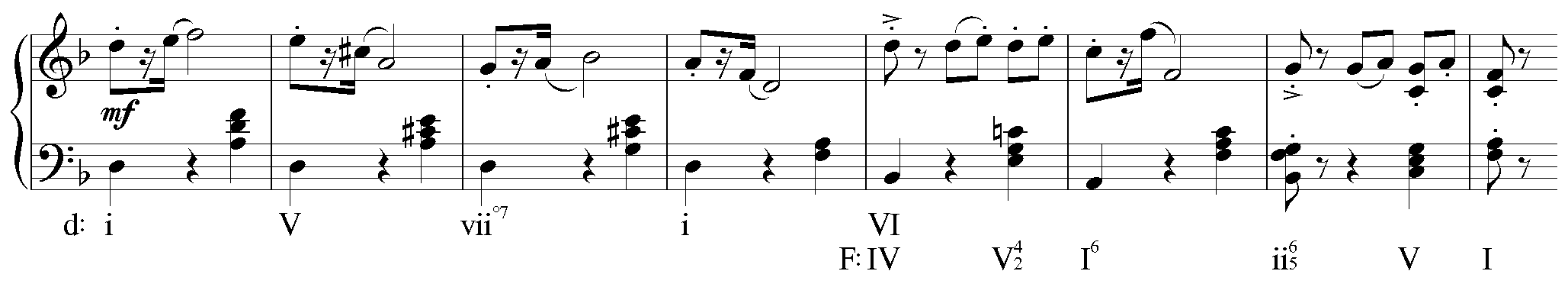
Common-chord modulation in Tchaikovsky's Album pour enfants (1887), Op. 39, No. 10, Mazurka

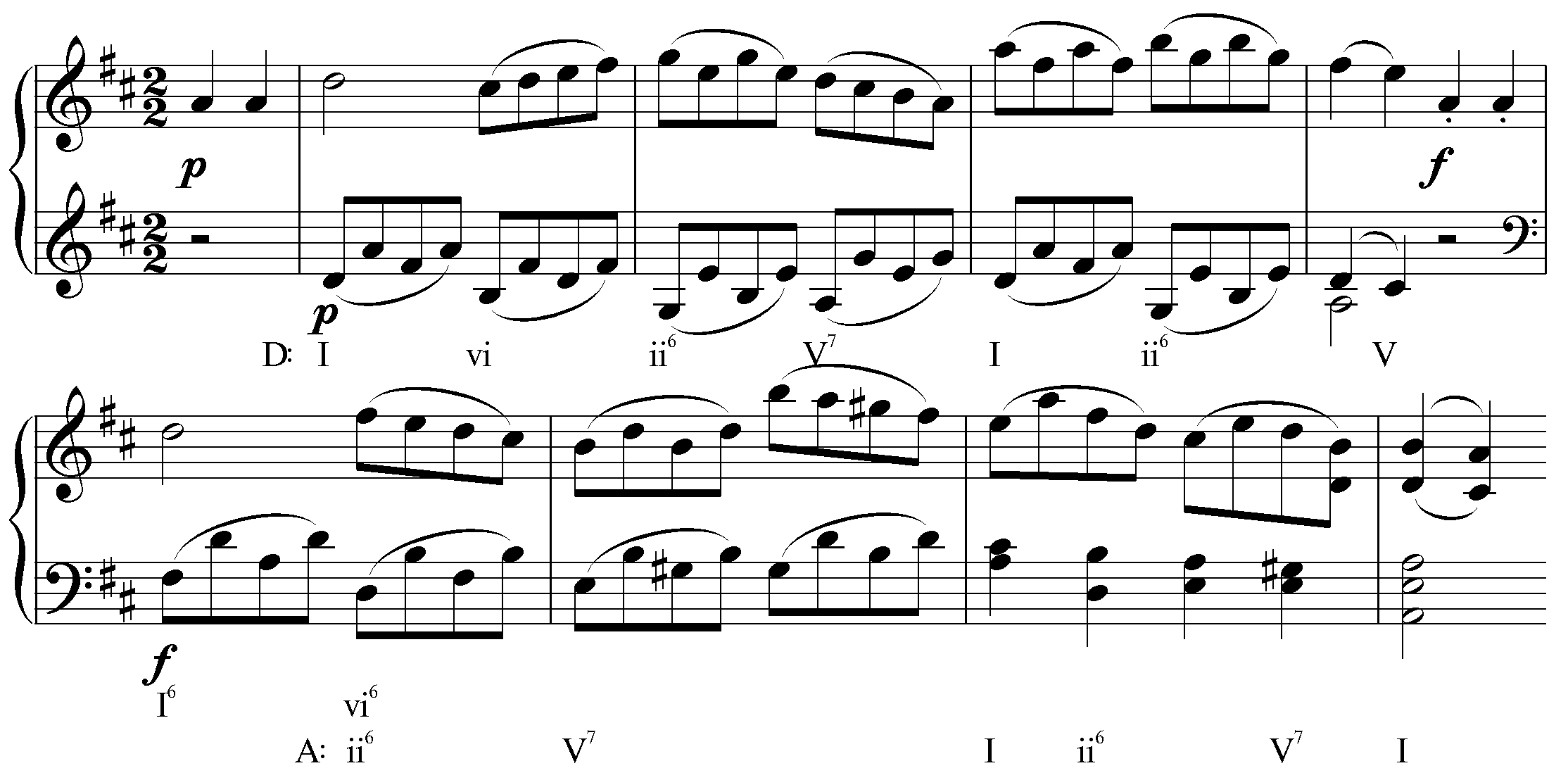
Common-chord modulation in the opening of Mozart's Sonata in D Major, K. 284, III

Common-chord modulation (also known as diatonic-pivot-chord modulation) moves from the original key to the destination key (usually a closely related key) by way of a chord both keys share: "Most modulations are made smoother by using one or more chords that are common to both keys." For example, G major and D major have four triad chords in common: G major, B minor, D major and E minor. This can be easily determined by a chart similar to the one below, which compares triad qualities. The I chord in G major—a G major chord—is also the IV chord in D major, so I in G major and IV in D major are aligned on the chart.

G major	I G	ii Am	iii Bm	IV; C	V D	vi Em	vii^{o} F♯^{o}
D major	IV; G	V A	vi Bm	vii^{o} C♯^{o}	I D	ii Em	iii F♯m

Any chord with the same root note and chord quality (major, minor, diminished) can be used as the pivot chord. Therefore, chords that are not generally found in the style of the piece (for example, major VII chords in a J. S. Bach-style chorale) are also not likely to be chosen as the pivot chord. The most common pivot chords are the predominant chords (ii and IV) in the new key. In analysis of a piece that uses this style of modulation, the common chord is labeled with its function in both the original and the destination keys, as it can be heard either way.

Where an altered chord is used as a pivot chord in either the old or new key (or both), this would be referred to as altered common chord modulation, in order to distinguish the chromaticism that would be introduced from the otherwise diatonic method.

=== Enharmonic modulation ===
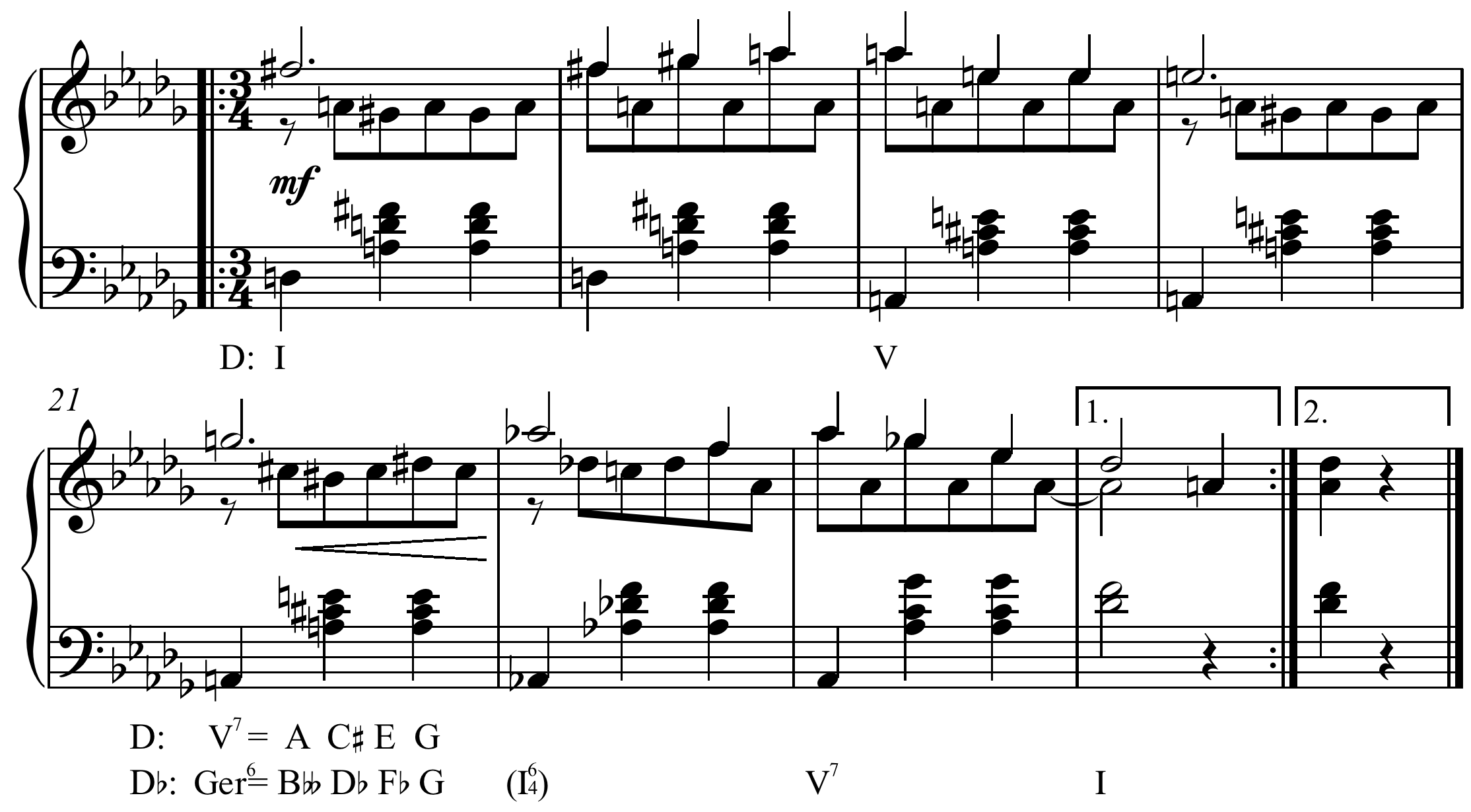
Modulation from D major to D♭ major in Schubert's Op. 9, No. 14, D. 365, mm. 17–24, using the German sixth, in the new key, that is enharmonic to the dominant seventh in the old key.

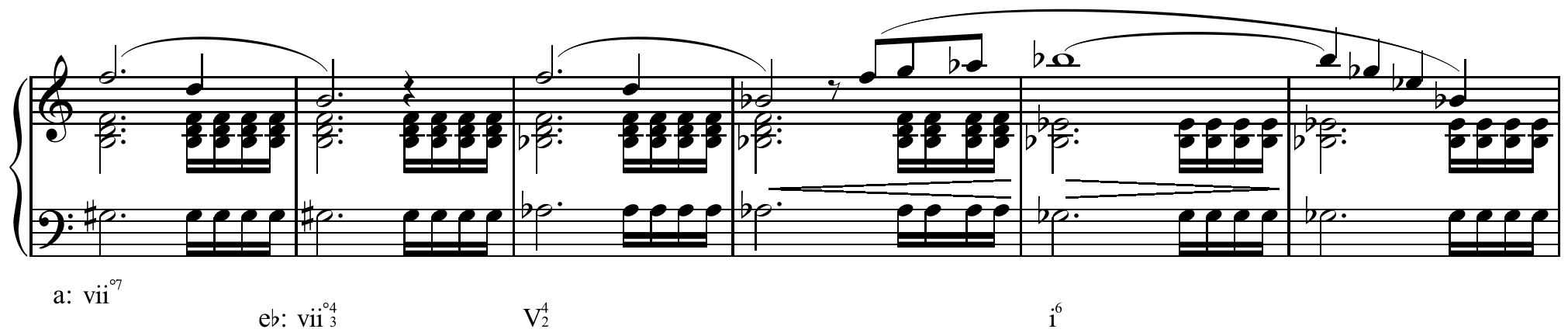
Modulation from A minor to E♭ minor in Schubert's Op.29, D. 804, I, mm.144-49, using vii^{o}^{7}: G♯^{o}^{7} ≡ D^{o}^{7} (≡ B^{o}^{7} ≡ F^{o}^{7})

An enharmonic modulation takes place when a chord is treated as if it were spelled enharmonically as a functional chord in the destination key, and then proceeds in the destination key. There are two main types of enharmonic modulations: dominant seventh/augmented sixth, and (fully) diminished seventh. Any dominant seventh or German sixth can be reinterpreted as the other by respelling the m7 or A6 chord tone (respectively) in order to modulate to a key a half-step away (descending or ascending); if the fifth-from-root chord tone of a German sixth is omitted, the result is an Italian sixth. A diminished seventh chord meanwhile, can be respelled in multiple other ways to form a diminished seventh chord in a key a minor third (m3 as root), tritone (d5 as root) or major sixth (d7 as root) away. Where the dominant seventh is found in all diatonic scales, the diminished seventh is found only in the harmonic scale naturally; an augmented sixth is itself an altered chord, relying on the raised fourth scale degree.

By combining the diminished seventh with a dominant seventh and/or augmented sixth, altering only one pivot note (by a half tone), it is possible to modulate quite smoothly from any key to any other in at most three chords, no matter how distant the starting and ending keys (be aware that only when modulating between key signatures featuring double-sharps/flats may the need to respell natural notes enharmonically arise); however, this may or may not require the use of altered chords (operating in the harmonic minor without an augmented sixth would not) where the effect can be less subtle than other modulations. The following are examples used to describe this in chord progressions starting from the key of D minor (these chords may instead be used in other keys as borrowed chords, such as the parallel major, or other forms of the minor):

- C♯–E–G–B♭ (dim. 7th), C–E–G–B♭ (lowering the root a semitone to a modulating dom. 7th), F–A–C (quasi-tonic) leads to F major—a relative major modulation (though not enharmonic); but exactly the same progression enharmonically C♯–E–G–B♭, C–E–G–A♯ (Ger. aug. 6th), E–G–B–E (quasi-tonic) leads somewhat unexpectedly to E natural/harmonic minor—a half-step modulation (ascending).
- C♯–E–G–B♭ (dim. 7th), A–C♯–E–G (lowering the 7th a semitone and respelling as a modulating dom. 7th), D–F♯–A (quasi-tonic) leads to the key of D major—a parallel modulation (though not enharmonic). Enharmonically: C♯–E–G–B♭, A–C♯–E–F (Ger. aug. 6th), C♯–E–G♯ (quasi-tonic) modulates to C♯ minor—a major seventh modulation/half-step descending.
- C♯–E–G–B♭ (dim. 7th), C♯–E♭–G–B♭ ≡ E♭–G–B♭–D♭ (lowering the major third a half tone and respelling as a modulating dom. 7th), A♭–C–E♭ (quasi-tonic) leads to A♭ major—a minor third and relative modulation (or tritone modulation if starting in D Major).

Note that in standard voice leading practice, any type of augmented sixth chord favors a resolution to the dominant chord (see: augmented sixth chord), with the exception of the German sixth, where it is difficult to avoid incurring parallel fifths; to prevent this, a cadential six four is commonly introduced before the dominant chord (which would then typically resolve to the tonic to establish tonality in the new key), or an Italian/French sixth is used instead.

In short, lowering any note of a diminished seventh chord by a half tone leads to a dominant seventh chord (or German sixth enharmonically), the lowered note being the root of the new chord. Raising any note of a diminished seventh chord by a half tone leads to a half-diminished seventh chord, the root of which is a whole step above the raised note. This means that any diminished chord can be modulated to eight different chords by simply lowering or raising any of its notes. If also employing enharmonic respelling of the diminished seventh chord, such as that beginning the modulation in the above examples (allowing for three other possible diminished seventh chords in other keys), the versatility of this combination technique and the wide range of available options in key modulation become apparent.

This type of modulation is particularly common in Romantic music, in which chromaticism rose to prominence.

Other types of enharmonic modulation include the augmented triad (III+) and French sixth (Fr+^{6}). Augmented triad modulation occurs in the same fashion as the diminished seventh, that is, to modulate to another augmented triad in a key: a major third (M3 as root) or minor sixth (A5 as root) away. French augmented sixth (Fr+^{6}) modulation is achieved similarly but by respelling both notes of either the top or bottom major third (i.e. root and major third or diminished fifth and augmented sixth) enharmonically and inverting with the other major third (i.e. diminished fifth and augmented sixth becomes root and major third of the new Fr+6); either choice results in the same chord and key modulation (a tritone away), as the diminished fifth always becomes the new root.

=== Common-tone modulation ===
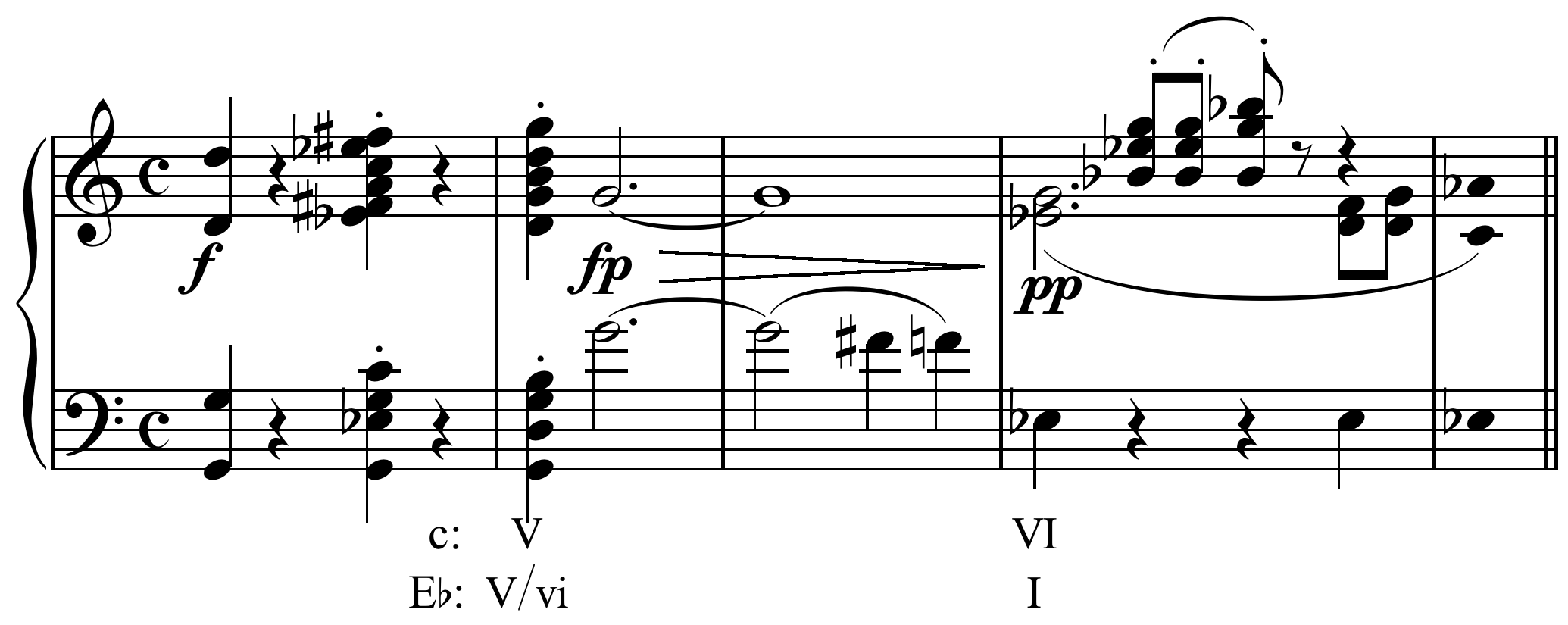
Modulation between relative keys, C minor and E♭ major, using a common tone, G, in Schubert's Op. 163 (D. 956).

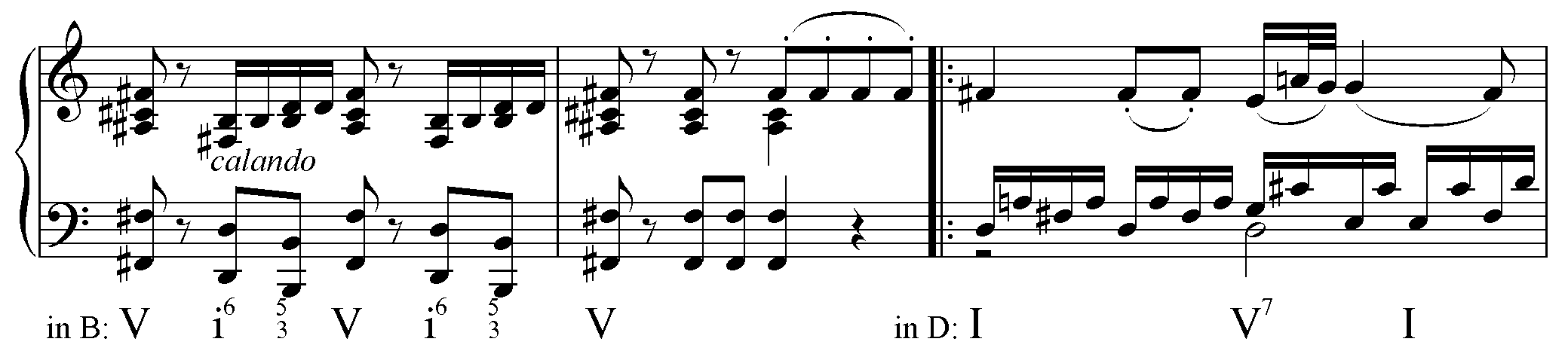
Common-tone modulation between chromatic mediants in Mozart's K.475

Common-tone modulation uses a sustained or repeated pitch from the old key as a bridge between it and the new key (common tone). Usually, this pitch will be held alone before the music continues in the new key. For example, a held F from a section in B♭ major could be used to transition to F major. This is used, for example, in Schubert's Unfinished Symphony. "If all of the notes in the chord are common to both scales (major or minor), then we call it a common chord modulation. If only one or two of the notes are common, then we call it common tone modulation."

Starting from a major chord, for example G major (G–B–D), there are twelve potential goals using a common-tone modulation: G minor, G♯ minor, B♭ major, B major, B minor, C major, C minor, D minor, D major, E♭ major, E major, E minor. Thus common-tone modulations are convenient for modulation by diatonic or chromatic third.

=== Chromatic modulation ===
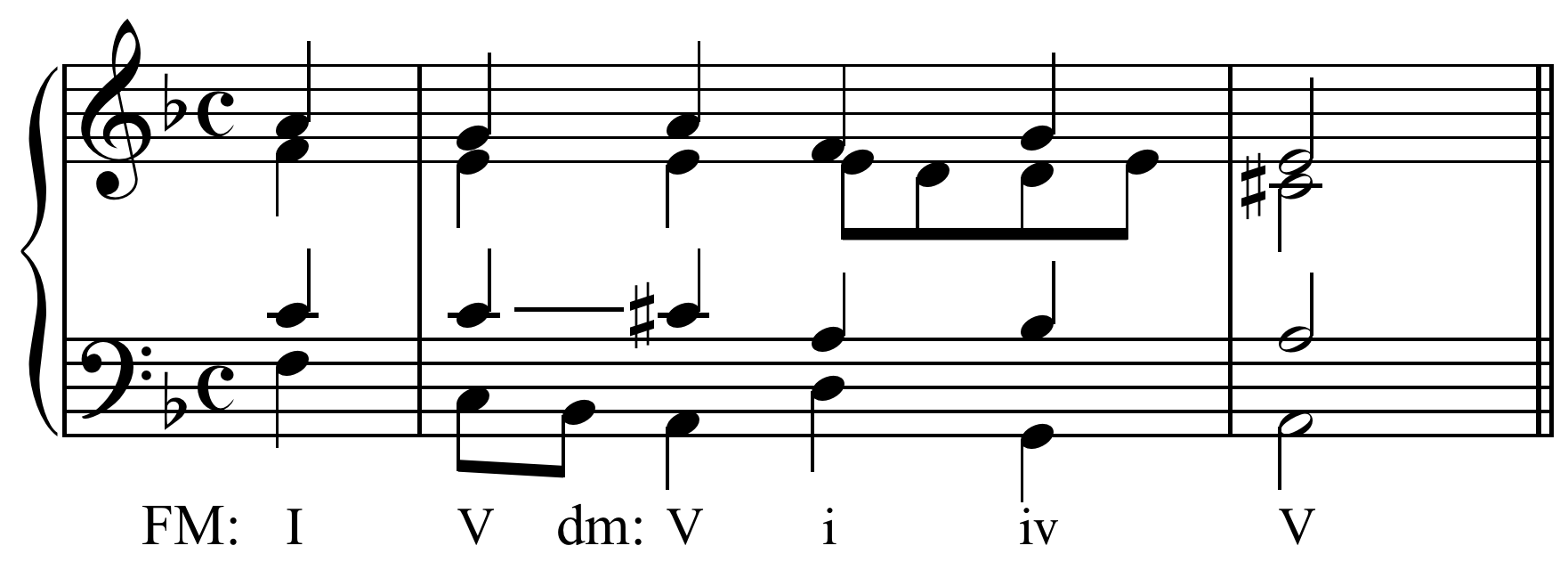
Chromatic modulation in Bach's Du grosser Schmerzensmann, BWV 300, mm. 5–6 ( with half cadence, with PAC) transitions from F major to D minor through the inflection of C♮ to C♯ between the second and third chords. Note that there is no common chord.

A chromatic modulation is so named because it occurs at the point of a chromatic progression, one which involves the chromatic inflection of one or more notes whose letter name, thus, remains the same though altered through an accidental. Chromatic modulations are often between keys which are not closely related. A secondary dominant or other chromatically altered chord may be used to lead one voice chromatically up or down on the way to the new key. (In standard four-part chorale-style writing, this chromatic line will most often be in one voice.) For example, a chromatic modulation from C major to D minor:

C major	IV; F	V/ii; A	ii Dm	
D minor			i Dm	(...)

In this case, the IV chord in C major (F major) would be spelled F–A–C, the V/ii chord in C major (A major) spelled A–C♯–E, and the ii chord in C major (D minor), D–F–A. Thus the chromaticism, C–C♯–D, along the three chords; this could easily be part-written so those notes all occurred in one voice. Despite the common chord (ii in C major or i in D minor), this modulation is chromatic due to this inflection.

The consonant triads for chromatic modulation are ♭III, ♭VI, ♭II, ♯iv, vii, and ♭VII in major, and ♮iii, ♮vi, ♭II, ♯iv, ii, and ♮vii in minor.

In the example pictured, a chromatic modulation from F major to D minor:

F major	I F	V C				
D minor			V A	i Dm	iv Gm	V A

In this case, the V chord in F major (C major) would be spelled C–E–G, the V in D minor (A major) would be spelled A–C♯–E. Thus the chromaticism, C–C♯–D, which is here split between voices but may often easily be part-written so that all three notes occur in one voice.

The combination of chromatic modulation with enharmonic modulation in late Romantic music led to extremely complex progressions in the music of such composers as César Franck, in which two or three key shifts may occur in the space of a single bar, each phrase ends in a key harmonically remote from its beginning, and great dramatic tension is built while all sense of underlying tonality is temporarily in abeyance. Good examples are to be found in the opening of his Symphony in D minor, of which he himself said (see Wikiquote) "I dared much, but the next time, you will see, I will dare even more..."; and his Trois Chorals for organ, especially the first and third of these, indeed fulfill that promise.

=== Phrase modulation ===
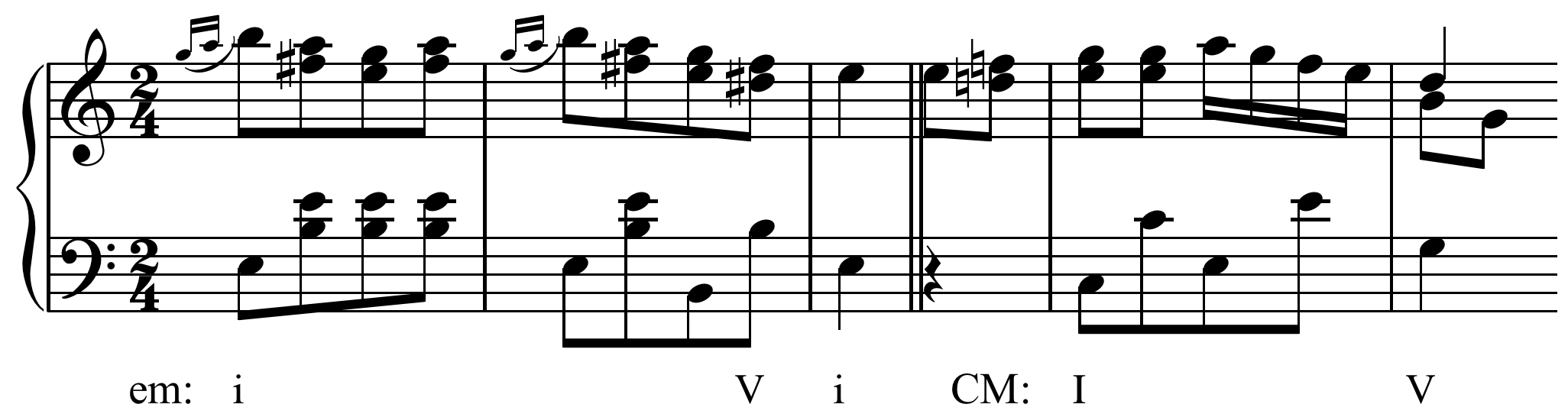
Phrase modulation in Mozart's Sonata in A major, K.331, III (Alla turca), mm. 6–10.

Phrase (also called direct, static, or abrupt) modulation is a modulation in which one phrase ends with a cadence in the original key, and the next phrase begins in the destination key without any transition material linking the two keys. This type of modulation is frequently done to a closely related key—particularly the dominant or the relative major/minor key.

An unprepared modulation is a modulation "without any harmonic bridge", characteristic of impressionism.

For example:

	A	E	A	F	B♭	F
A major	I	V	I			
F major				I	IV	I

When phrase modulation comes at or near the end of a musical piece, it is referred to as a truck driver's gear change, especially in popular music.

=== Sequential modulation ===
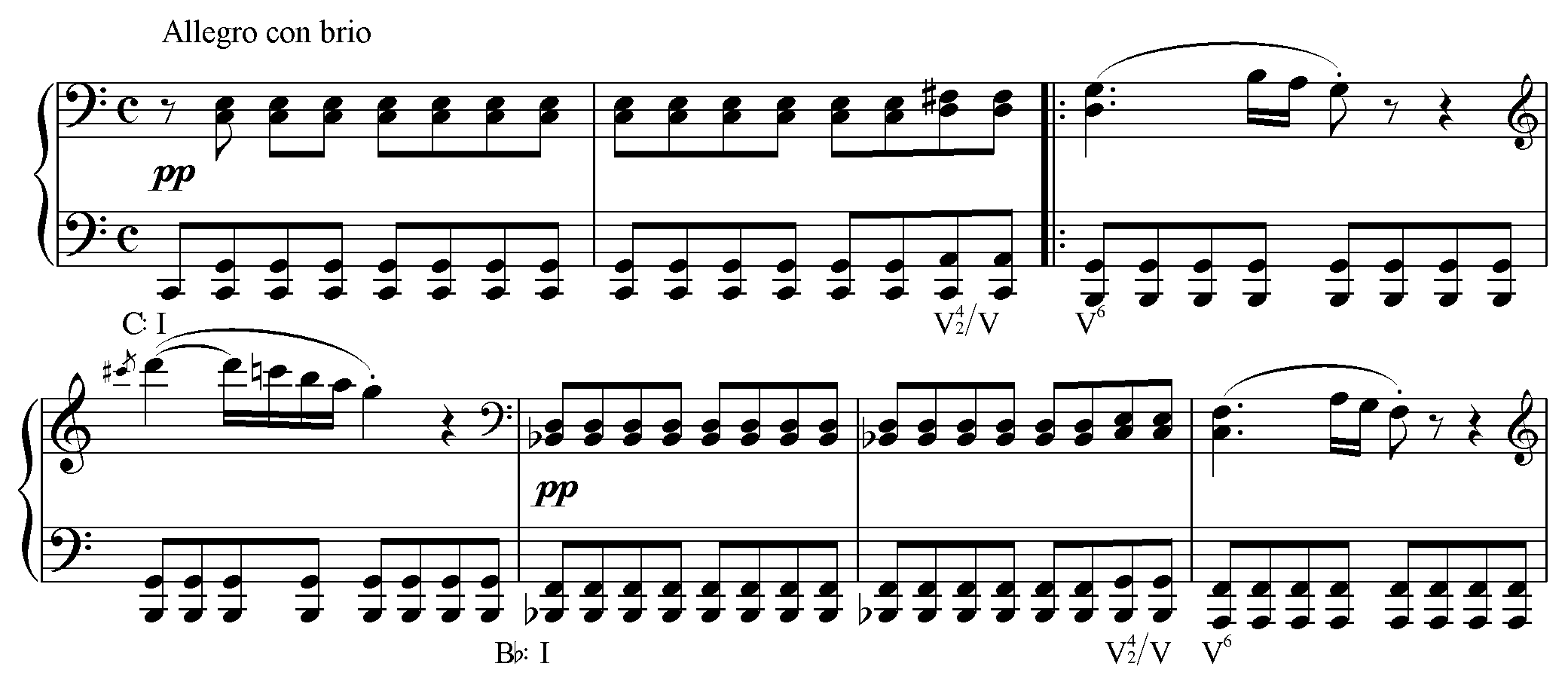
Sequential modulation in Beethoven's Sonata Op. 53, movement I

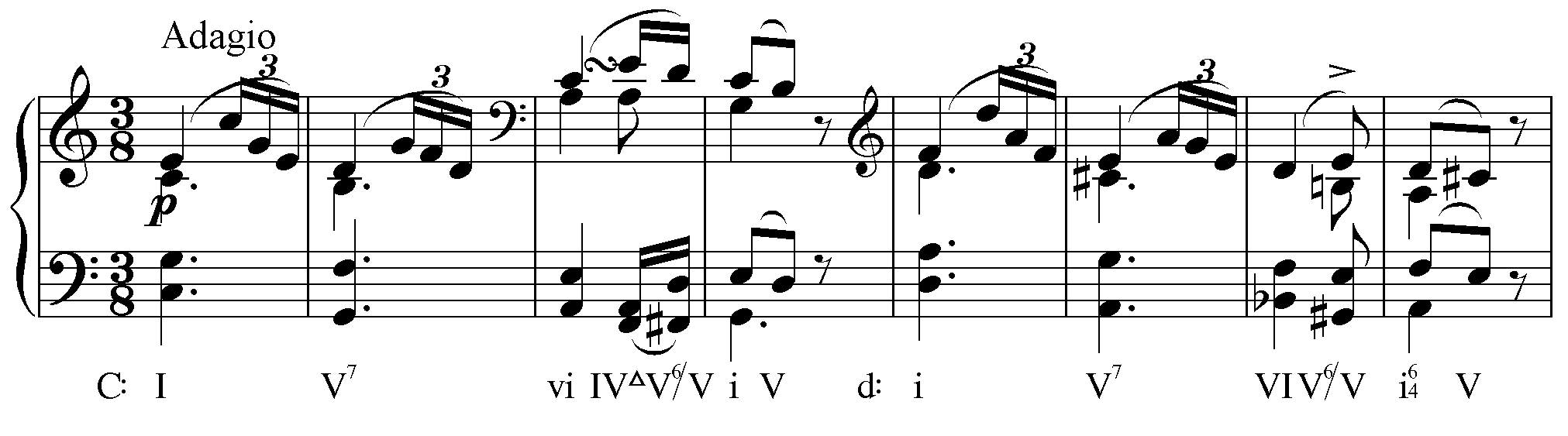
Sequential modulation in Schubert's Piano Sonata in E Major, D. 459, movement III

"A passage in a given key ending in a cadence might be followed by the same passage transposed (up or down) to another key," this being known as sequential modulation. Although a sequence does not have to modulate, it is also possible to modulate by way of a sequence. A sequential modulation is also called rosalia. The sequential passage will begin in the home key, and may move either diatonically or chromatically. Harmonic function is generally disregarded in a sequence, or, at least, it is far less important than the sequential motion. For this reason, a sequence may end at a point that suggests a different tonality than the home key, and the composition may continue naturally in that key.

=== Chain modulation ===
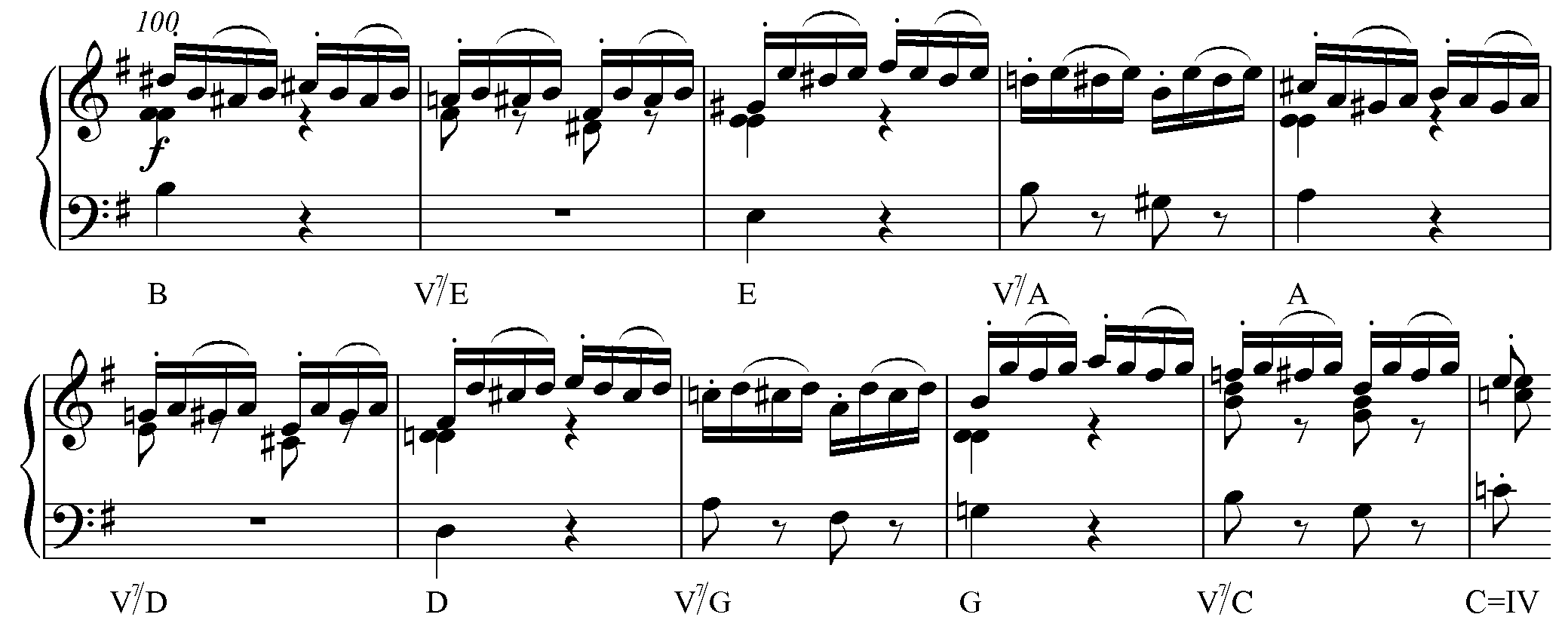
Sequential modulation through the circle of fifths in Quartet Op. 3, No. 3, IV, Hob. III:15, formerly attributed to Haydn (ca. 1840)

Distant keys may be reached sequentially through closely related keys by chain modulation, for example C to G to D or C to C minor to E♭ major. A common technique is the addition of the minor seventh after each tonic is reached, thus turning it into a dominant seventh chord:

D	→	D^{7}	G	→	G^{7}	C	→	C^{7}	F
I	→	V^{7}	I	→	V^{7}	I	→	V^{7}	I

=== Changes between parallel keys ===
Since modulation is defined as a change of tonic (tonality or tonal center), the change between minor and its parallel major or the reverse is technically not a modulation but a change in mode. Major tonic harmony that concludes music in minor contains what is known as a Picardy third. Any harmony associated with the minor mode in the context of major musical passages is often referred to as a borrowed chord, which creates mode mixture.

== Common modulations ==
The circle of fifths drawn within the chromatic circle as a dodecagram

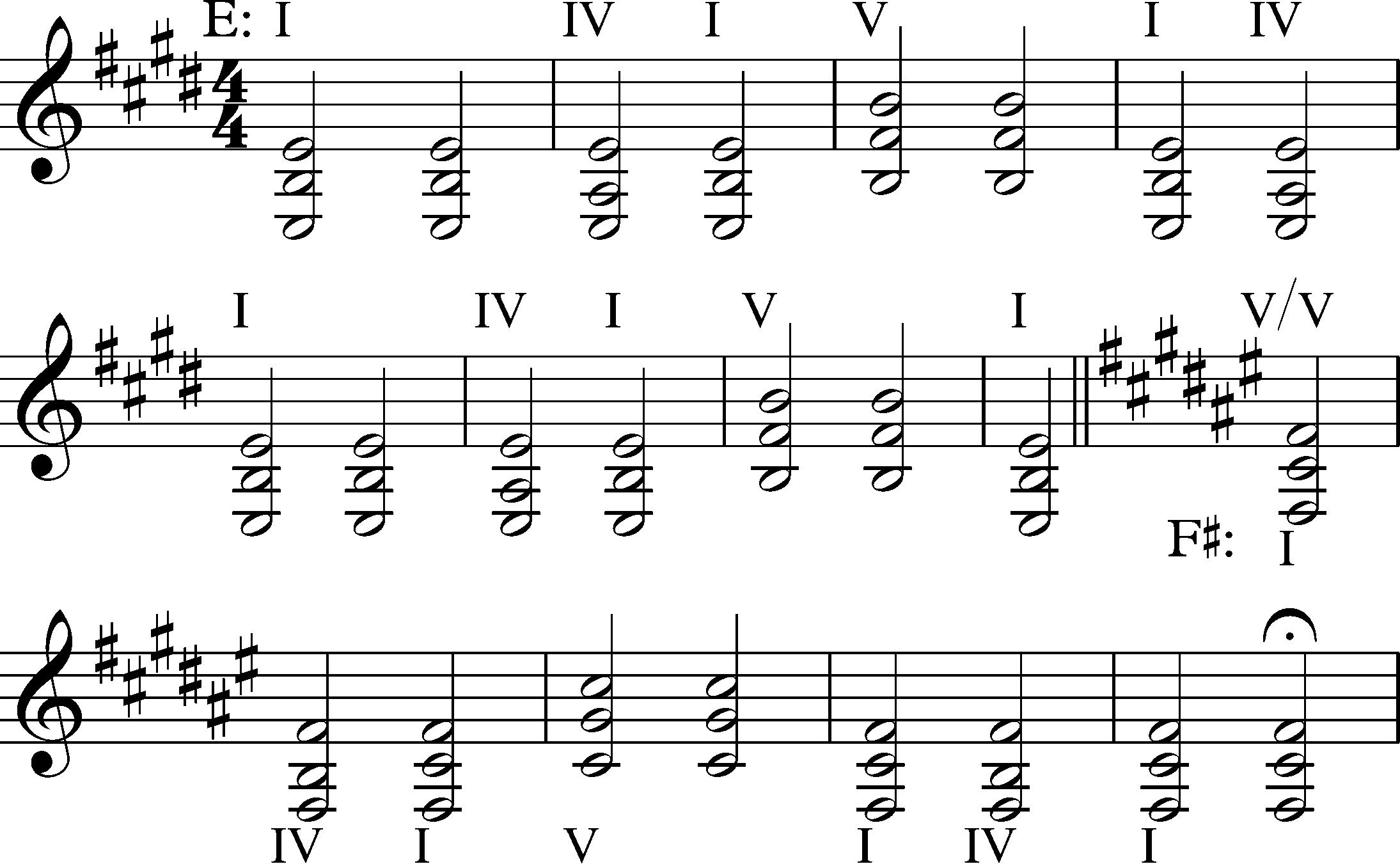
Modulation up a whole step at the end of "Because the Night"

The most common modulations are to closely related keys (I, V, IV, vi, iii, ii). V (dominant) is the most frequent goal and, in minor, III (relative key) is also a common goal. Modulation to the dominant or the subdominant is relatively simple as they are adjacent steps on the circle of fifths. Modulations to the relative major or minor are also simple, as these keys share all pitches in common. Modulation to distantly related keys is often done smoothly through using chords in successive related keys, such as through the circle of fifths, the entirety of which may be used in either direction:

D – A – E – B/C♭ – F♯/G♭ – C♯/D♭ – G♯/A♭ – D♯/E♭ – A♯/B♭ – F – C – G – D

If a given key were G major, the following chart could be used:

C	—	G	—	D

From G (which is the given key), a musician would go P5 (a perfect fifth) above G (which is D) and also P5 below G (which is C).

From this, the musician would go to G major's relative minor which is E minor, and potentially to C major and D major's related minor as well (a musician who does not know the related minor for C and D major may also go P5 below or above E minor).

C	—	G	—	D
|		|		|
Am		Em		Bm

By using the relative minor keys one can find the specific key that the key can modulate into.

Many musicians use the circle of fifths to find these keys and make similar charts to help with the modulation.

== Significance ==
In certain classical music forms, a modulation can have structural significance. In sonata form, for example, a modulation separates the first subject from the second subject. Frequent changes of key characterize the development section of sonatas. Moving to the subdominant is a standard practice in the trio section of a march in a major key, while a minor march will typically move to the relative major.

Changes of key may also represent changes in mood. In many genres of music, moving from a lower key to a higher often indicates an increase in energy.

Change of key is not possible in the full chromatic or the twelve tone technique, as the modulatory space is completely filled; i.e., if every pitch is equal and ubiquitous there is nowhere else to go. Thus other differentiating methods are used, most importantly ordering and permutation. However, certain pitch formations may be used as a "tonic" or home area.

== Popularity ==
The popularity of the key change varies with musical trends over time. In every decade from the 1960s to the 1990s, about 25% of No. 1 hits on the Billboard Hot 100 had a key change; however, in the 2010s, only one Billboard No. 1 hit ("Sicko Mode" by Travis Scott) had a key change. Since 2020, the lone single that shifts keys late in the song, topped the Hot 100, "Dynamite" by BTS.

== Other types ==
Though modulation generally refers to changes of key, any parameter may be modulated, particularly in music of the 20th and 21st century. Metric modulation (known also as tempo modulation) is the most common, while timbral modulation (gradual changes in tone color), and spatial modulation (changing the location from which sound occurs) are also used.

Modulation may also occur from a single tonality to a polytonality, often by beginning with a duplicated tonic chord and modulating the chords in contrary motion until the desired polytonality is reached.

== See also ==
- Level (music)
- Modulating subject
- Polytonality
- Progressive tonality
- Graha bhedam
