= Vi–ii–V–I =

Type of chord progression

In music, the vi–ii–V–I progression is a chord progression (also called the circle progression for the circle of fifths, along which it travels). A vi–ii–V–I progression in C major (with inverted chords) is shown below.

It is "undoubtedly the most common and the strongest of all harmonic progressions" and consists of "adjacent roots in ascending fourth or descending fifth relationship", with movement by ascending perfect fourth being equivalent to movement by descending perfect fifth due to inversion. For instance, in C major, the chords are Am–Dm–G–C, which have roots that descend by perfect fifth (or ascend by fourth).

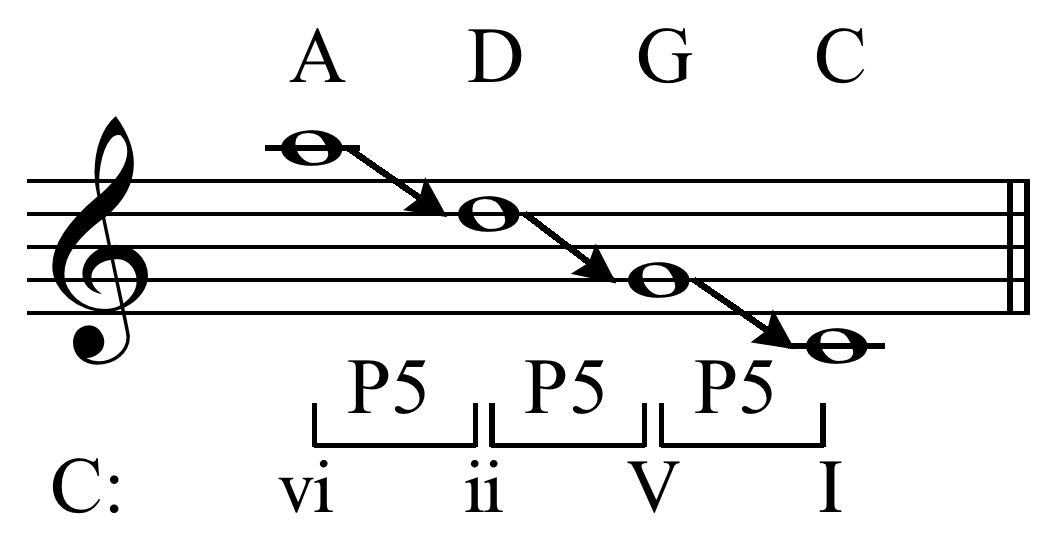

== Examples ==
Examples of vi–ii–V–I are shown below.

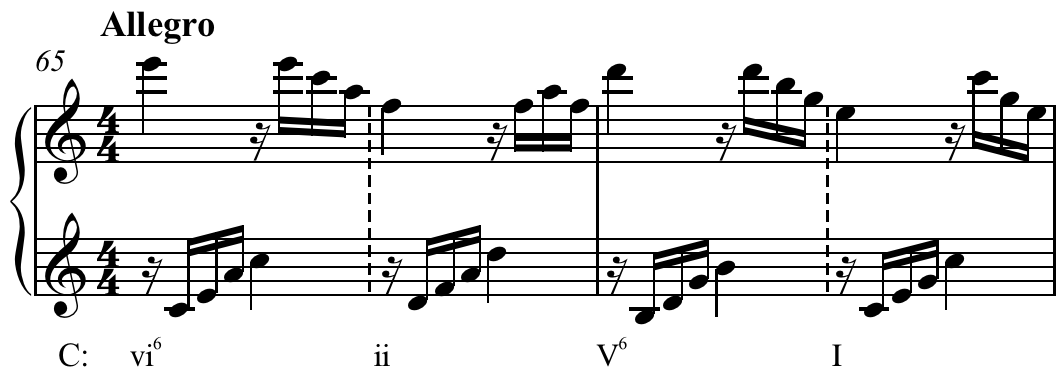
A vi–ii–V–I chord progression in Mozart's Sonata, K. 545..

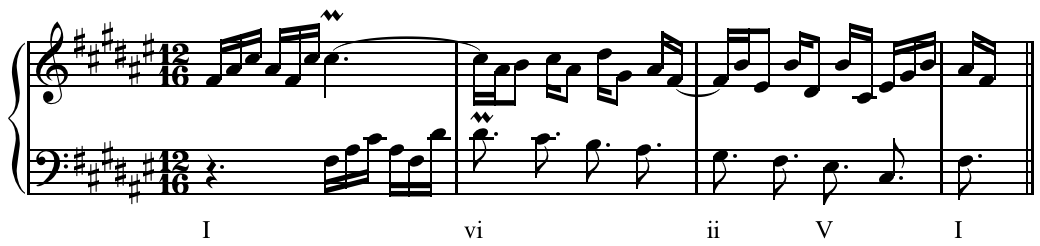
A vi–ii–V–I progression in J.S. Bach's The Well-Tempered Clavier Book I, Prelude in F♯ major.

Pop songs that include the vi–ii–V–I progression include Weezer's "Island in the Sun" and Talk Talk's "It's My Life".

== I−vi−ii−V ==
A I–vi–ii–V chord progression in C major.

I−vi−ii−V is one of the most common chord progressions in jazz. The progression is often used as a turnaround, occurring as the last two bars of a chorus or section. The I−vi−ii−V chord progression occurs as a two-bar pattern in the A section of the rhythm changes, the progression based on George Gershwin's "I Got Rhythm". It can be varied as well: according to Mark Levine, "[t]oday's players usually play a dominant 7th chord rather than a minor 7th chord as the VI chord in a I–VI–II–V."

In the jazz minor scale, the diatonic progression below is possible.

| i^{M7} vi^{ø}^{7} | ii^{7} V+^{7} |
| Cm^{M7} Am^{7♭5} | Dm^{7} G^{7♭13} |

== I−IV−vii°−iii−vi−ii−V−I progression ==
The circle progression is commonly a succession through all seven diatonic chords of a diatonic scale by fifths, including one progression by diminished fifth, (in C: between F and B) and one diminished chord (in C major, B^{o}), returning to the tonic at the end. A full circle of fifths progression in C major is shown below.

Shorter progressions may be derived from this by selecting certain specific chords from the progression through all seven diatonic chords. The ii–V–I turnaround lies at the end of the circle progression, as does the vi–ii–V–I progression of root movement by descending fifths, which establishes tonality and also strengthens the key through the contrast of minor and major.

In a minor key, the progression is i–iv–VII–III–VI–ii°–V–i.

== See also ==
- Approach chord
- Predominant chord
- Dominant (music)
- Extended dominant
- Ragtime progression – V^{7}/vi–V^{7}/ii–V^{7}/V–V^{7}–I
- Tadd Dameron turnaround
- Royal road progression – IV–V–iii–vi
