= Augmented second =

- Inverse: diminished seventh

Name
- Other names: -
- Abbreviation: A2

Size
- Semitones: 3
- Interval class: 3
- Just interval: 75:64, 81:68, 125:108, 7:6, 19683:16384

Cents
- 12-Tone equal temperament: 300
- Just intonation: 275, 253, 267, 318

In Western classical music, an augmented second is an interval created by widening a major second by a chromatic semitone, spanning three semitones and enharmonically equivalent to a minor third in 12-tone equal temperament. For instance, the interval from C to D is a major second, two semitones wide, and the interval from C to D♯ is an augmented second, spanning three semitones.

== Usage ==
Augmented seconds occur in many scales, including the various modes of the harmonic minor and double harmonic scales. In harmonic minor, the augmented second occurs between the sixth and seventh scale degrees. For example, in the scale of A harmonic minor, the notes F and G♯ form the interval of an augmented second. This distinguishing feature of harmonic minor scales occurs as a consequence of the seventh scale degree having been chromatically raised in order to allow chords in a minor key to follow the same rules of cadence observed in major keys, where the V chord is "dominant" (that is, contains a major triad plus a minor seventh). An augmented second also appears in the diminished seventh chord (in 1st, 2nd, and 3rd inversion) between the diminished seventh and the root, and in the German sixth chord between the ♭ and ♯ degrees.

== Tuning ==
An augmented second is enharmonically equivalent to a minor third in 12-tone equal temperament, but is distinguished in other tunings. In tunings near quarter-comma meantone it approximates the septimal minor third of ratio 7:6. In pythagorean tuning and schismatic temperament, however, it closely approximates the classical minor third of ratio 6:5. In superpyth temperament, the fifth is sharpened so that the augmented second reaches the classical major third of ratio 5:4.

The 75:64 just augmented second arises in the justly tuned C harmonic minor scale between A♭ (tuned to 8:5) and B (tuned to 15:8). It is very close to the 7:6 septimal minor third, differing by a septimal kleisma.
