= Augmented sixth chord =

Chord that contains the interval of an augmented sixth

A German sixth chord on the last beat of m. 96 in Scott Joplin's "Binks' Waltz" (1905).

In music theory, an augmented sixth chord contains the interval of an augmented sixth, usually above its bass tone. This chord has its origins in the Renaissance, was further developed in the Baroque, and became a distinctive part of the musical style of the Classical and Romantic periods.

Conventionally used with a predominant function (resolving to the dominant), the three most common types of augmented sixth chords are usually called the Italian sixth, the French sixth, and the German sixth.

== Augmented sixth interval ==
The interval of the augmented sixth normally resolves outwards by semitone to an octave.

The augmented sixth interval is typically between the sixth degree of the minor scale, ♭, and the raised fourth degree, ♯. With standard voice leading, the chord is followed directly or indirectly by some form of the dominant chord, in which both ♭ and ♯ have resolved to the fifth scale degree,. This tendency to resolve outwards to is why the interval is spelled as an augmented sixth, rather than enharmonically as a minor seventh (♭ and ♭).

Although augmented sixth chords are more common in the minor mode, they are also used in the major mode by borrowing ♭ of the parallel minor scale.

== Types ==
There are three main types of augmented sixth chords, commonly known as the Italian sixth, the French sixth, and the German sixth.

Though each is named after a European nationality, theorists disagree on their precise origins and have struggled for centuries to define their roots, and fit them into conventional harmonic theory. According to Kostka and Payne, the other two terms are similar to the Italian sixth, which, "has no historical authenticity-[being] simply a convenient and traditional label."

=== Italian sixth ===
The second movement of Beethoven's Piano Sonata in F♯ major, Op. 78, begins with an Italian sixth chord.

The Italian sixth (It^{+6} or It^{6} or ♯iv^{6}) is derived from iv^{6} with an altered fourth scale degree, ♯. This is the only augmented sixth chord comprising just three distinct notes; in four-part writing, the tonic pitch is doubled.

The Italian sixth is enharmonically equivalent to an incomplete dominant seventh. ♭VI7=♯V7: A♭, C, (E♭,) G♭.

Its label in functional theory is D/5-_7.

=== French sixth ===
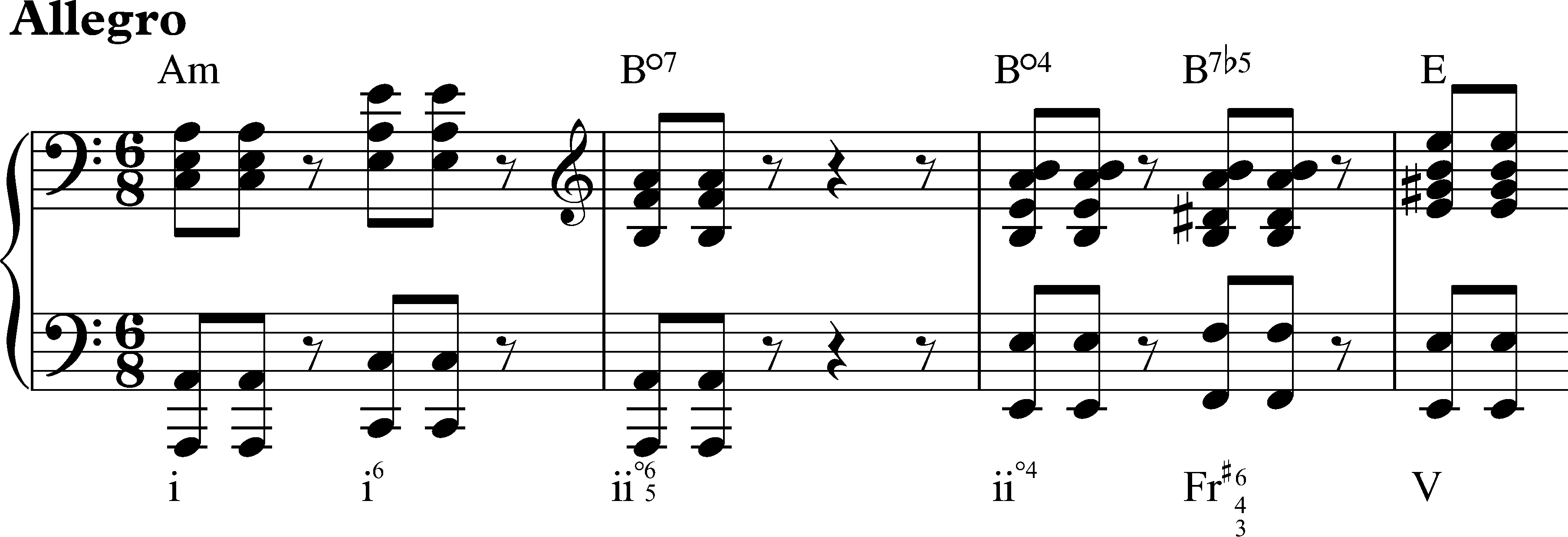
A French sixth chord in Schubert's Die schöne Müllerin, #5: "Am Feierabend"

The French sixth (Fr^{+6} or Fr^{4}_{3}) is similar to the Italian, but with an additional tone,. The notes of the French sixth chord are all contained within the same whole tone scale, lending a sonority common to French music in the 19th century (especially associated with Impressionist music), though they also make frequent appearances in Russian music.

This chord has the same notes as a dominant seventh flat five chord and is in fact the second inversion of II^{7♭5}.

Its label in functional theory is D5-_7.

=== German sixth ===
The German sixth (Ger^{+6} or Ger^{6}_{5}) is also like the Italian, but with an added tone, ♭.

In Classical music, however, it appears in much the same places as the other variants, though perhaps less often because of the contrapuntal difficulties outlined below. It appears frequently in the works of Beethoven, (Note: Notable examples include the themes of the slow movements (both in variation form) of the op. 57 ("Appassionata") and 109 piano sonatas.) and in ragtime music. The German sixth chord is enharmonically equivalent to a dominant seventh chord though it functions differently.

Its label in functional theory is D/5-_79-.

==== Avoiding parallel fifths ====
It is more difficult to avoid parallel fifths when resolving a German sixth chord to the dominant chord. These parallel fifths, referred to as Mozart fifths, were occasionally accepted by common practice composers. There are two ways they can be avoided:

1. The ♭ can move to either or, thereby generating an Italian or French sixth, respectively, and eliminating the perfect fifth between ♭6 and ♭.
2. The chord can resolve to a ^{6}_{4} chord, functionally either as a cadential ^{6}_{4} intensification of V, or as the second inversion of I. The cadential ^{6}_{4}, in turn, resolves to a root-position V. This progression ensures that, in its voice leading, each pair of voices moves either by oblique motion or contrary motion and avoids parallel motion altogether. In minor modes, both and ♭ do not move during the resolution of the German sixth to the cadential ^{6}_{4}.
  In major modes, ♭3 can be enharmonically respelled as ♯, allowing it to resolve upwards to ♮. This may be called a doubly-augmented sixth, although in reality it is the fourth that is doubly augmented.

=== Other types ===
Other variants of augmented sixth chords can be found in the repertoire, and are sometimes given whimsical geographical names. For example: 4–♭6–7–♯2; (F–A♭–B–D♯) is called by one source an Australian sixth, and 1- 2 - ♯4 - ♯6 (C - D - F♯ - A♯ ) sometimes called the Japanese sixth, Blackadder, or Ikisugi chord. Such anomalies usually have alternative interpretations.

== Function ==
=== Standard function ===
From the Baroque to the Romantic periods, augmented sixth chords had the same harmonic function: as a chromatically altered predominant chord (typically, an alteration of ii^{4}_{3}, IV^{6}_{5}, vi^{7} or their parallel equivalents in the minor mode) leading to a dominant chord. This movement to the dominant is heightened by the semitonal resolution to from above and below (from ♭ and ♯); essentially, these two notes act as leading-tones.

During the Baroque and early Classical periods, for instruments tuned to meantone systems rather than well temperaments, the augmented sixth note (^{♯}6) produced an excellent approximation to a harmonic seventh. The match is particularly close in quarter comma meantone, where ^{♯}6 is only 3 cents flat from H_{7}. This made a major triad with an added ^{♯}6 a fully consonant / harmonic chord (harmonics 4, 5, 6, 7); as opposed to a modern equal tempered dominant seventh chord (M add^{♭}7) which misses being harmonic with the minor 7th pitch 31 cents sharp – a dissonance.

This characteristic has led many analysts to compare the voice leading of augmented sixth chords to the secondary dominant V of V because of the presence of ♯, the leading-tone of V, in both chords. In the major mode, the chromatic voice leading is more pronounced because of the presence of two chromatically altered notes, ♭ and ♯, rather than just ♯.

In most occasions, the augmented-sixth chords precede either the dominant, or the tonic in second inversion. The augmented sixths can be treated as chromatically altered passing chords.

=== Other functions ===
Augmented sixths as dominants in C major, according to Tchaikovsky. Notice the early resolution of an inner voice to avoid parallel fifths in the last example.

In the late Romantic period and other musical traditions, especially jazz, other harmonic possibilities of augmented sixth variants and sonorities outside its function as a predominant were explored, exploiting their particular properties. An example of this is through the "reinterpretation" of the harmonic function of a chord: since a chord could simultaneously have more than one enharmonic spelling with different functions (i.e., both predominant as a German sixth and dominant as a dominant seventh), its function could be reinterpreted mid-phrase. This heightens both chromaticism by making possible the tonicization of remotely related keys, and possible dissonances with the juxtaposition of remotely related keys.

The French sixth saw much non-functional use in Russian music of the late-Romantic period. Due to its construction of two tritones separated by a major third, it has transpositional invariance and was often used to create tonal ambiguity in highly chromatic music of the nineteenth century. This use actually began with its use by Wagner and Bruckner (eg. the prelude from Tristan und Isolde and Bruckner's third symphony), but is most notable in Russian works such as Rimsky-Korsakov's Scheherezade and Scriabin's Prometheus: The Poem of Fire. The chord is separated by only a single note from the half-diminished chord, or the "Tristan chord," as well as the German sixth or dominant seventh. Tonal ambiguity is created by the French sixth as it is symmetrical about a tritone, for example, the notes of a French sixth chord built on G are the same as the notes as the chord built on C sharp, up to enharmonic equivalence. Due to this tonal ambiguity, the French sixth was often used in lieu of the triad, carrying with it an unresolved sonority.

Scriabin also began to add chord extensions to the French sixth, for example, he added a sixth and a ninth to create his 'mystic chord' which is found in his aforementioned Prometheus tone poem. The chord was often combined with the acoustic and octatonic scales, as the latter in particular contains two distinct French sixths and thus has similar symmetric properties. Such a combination can be found ubiquitously in much of Rimsky-Korsakov and Scriabin's music, as well as in some twentieth century French works such as Debussy's Nuages and Ravel's Scarbo.

Tchaikovsky considered the augmented sixth chords to be altered dominant chords. He described the augmented sixth chords to be inversions of the diminished triad and of dominant and diminished seventh chords with a lowered second degree (♭), and accordingly resolving into the tonic. He notes that, "some theorists insist upon [augmented sixth chord's] resolution not into the tonic but into the dominant triad, and regard them as being erected not on the altered 2nd degree, but on the altered 6th degree in major and on the natural 6th degree in minor", yet calls this view, "fallacious", insisting that a, "chord of the augmented sixth on the 6th degree is nothing else than a modulatory degression into the key of the dominant".

The example below shows the last nine measures from Schubert's Piano Sonata in A major, D. 959. In m. 352, an Italian sixth chord built on scale degree ♭ functions as a substitute for the dominant.

== Inversions ==
Augmented sixth chords are occasionally used with a different chord member in the bass. Since there is no consensus among theorists that they are in root position in their normal form, the word "inversion" isn't necessarily accurate, but is found in some textbooks, nonetheless. Sometimes, "inverted" augmented sixth chords occur as a product of voice leading.

Rousseau held that the chord could not be inverted. Seventeenth century instances of the augmented sixth with the sharp note in the bass are generally limited to German sources.

The excerpt below is from J.S. Bach's Mass in B minor. At the end of the second measure, the augmented sixth is inverted to create a diminished third or tenth between the bass and the soprano (C♯–E♭); these two voices resolve inward to an octave.

== Related chords ==
In music theory, the double-diminished triad is an archaic concept and term referring to a triad, or three note chord, which, already being minor, has its root raised a semitone, making it "doubly diminished". However, this may be used as the derivation of the augmented sixth chord. For example, F–A♭–C is a minor triad, so F♯–A♭–C is a doubly diminished triad. This is enharmonically equivalent to G♭–A♭–C, an incomplete dominant seventh A♭^{7}, missing its fifth), which is a tritone substitute that resolves to G. Its inversion, A♭–C–F♯, is the Italian sixth chord that resolves to G.

Classical harmonic theory would notate the tritone substitute as an augmented sixth chord on ♭2. The augmented sixth chord can either be (i) an It^{+6} enharmonically equivalent to a dominant seventh chord (with a missing fifth); (ii) a Ger^{+6} equivalent to a dominant seventh chord with (with a fifth); or (iii) a Fr^{+6} equivalent to the Lydian dominant (with a missing fifth), all of which serve in a classical context as a substitute for the secondary dominant of V.

All variants of augmented sixth chords are closely related to the applied dominant V^{7} of ♭II. Both Italian and German variants are enharmonically identical to dominant seventh chords. For example, in the key of C, the German sixth chord could be reinterpreted as the applied dominant of D♭.

Simon Sechter explains the chord of the French sixth chord as being a chromatically altered version of a seventh chord on the second degree of the scale,. The German sixth is explained as a chromatically altered ninth chord on the same root but with the root omitted.

The tendency of the interval of the augmented sixth to resolve outwards is therefore explained by the fact that the A♭, being a dissonant note, a diminished fifth above the root (D), and flatted, must fall, whilst the F♯ – being chromatically raised – must rise.

== Relationship between the different types ==
The following "curious chromatic sequence", graphed by Dmitri Tymoczko as a four-dimensional tesseract, outlines the relationships between the augmented sixth chords in 12TET tuning:

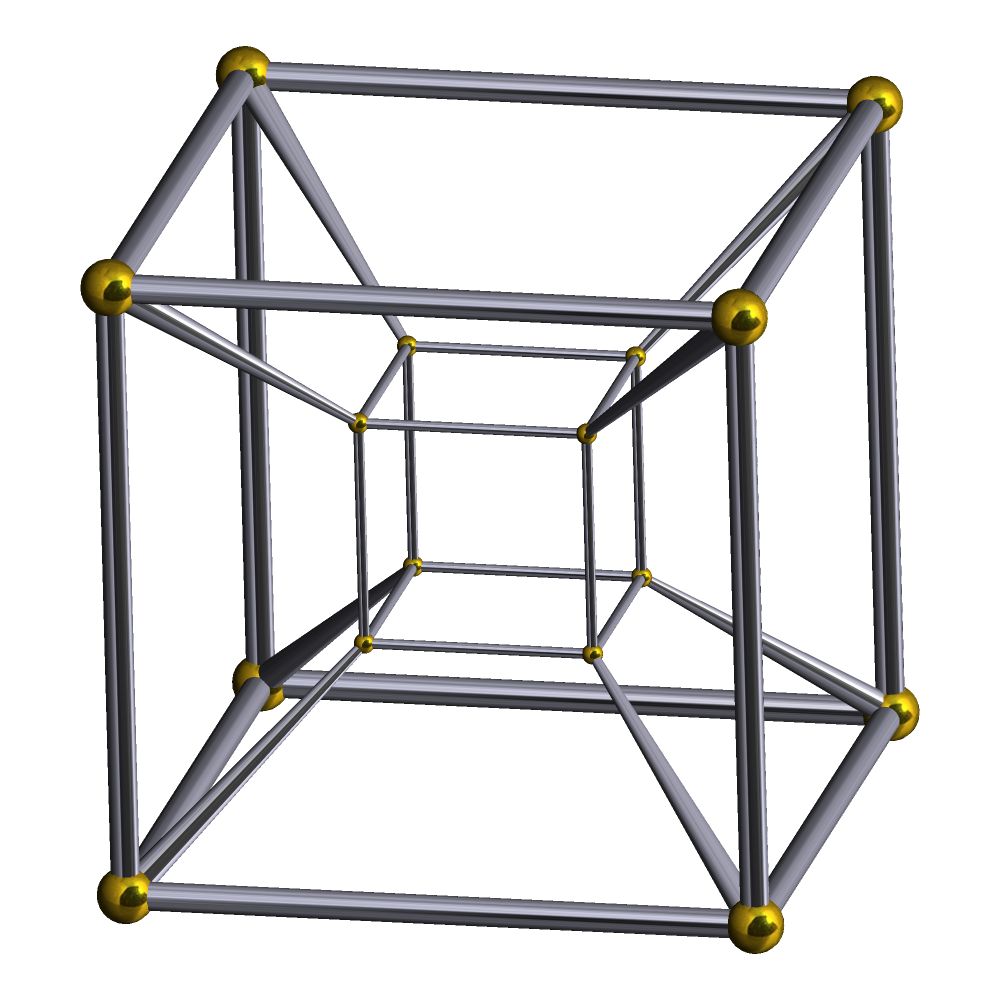
A tesseract. The diminished seventh chords occupy points on two diagonally opposite corners.

- Starting with a diminished seventh chord, lower any factor by a semitone. The result is equivalently to a German sixth chord.
- From the German sixth chord, lower any factor by a semitone so that the result is ancohemitonic (i.e.: possesses no half steps). The result is a French sixth chord or minor seventh chord possibly posing as a virtual augmented sixth.
- From the French sixth chord (or minor seventh chord posing as augmented sixth), there exists a factor which, when lowered by semitone, gives a result equivalent to a half-diminished seventh chord possibly posing as a virtual augmented sixth.
- From the half-diminished seventh chord as augmented sixth, there exists a factor which, when lowered by a semitone, is equivalent to a diminished seventh chord at the interval one semitone lower than the diminished seventh chord which started the sequence.
- Three repetitions of the above complete the cycle in modulo-12 note space, forming a necklace of three tesseracts joined at opposite corners by diminished seventh chords and subsuming all 12 notes of the chromatic scale.

=== Minor seventh as virtual augmented sixth chord ===
The minor seventh chord may also have its interval of minor seventh (between the root and seventh degree (i.e.: C–B♭ in C–E♭–G–B♭) rewritten as an augmented sixth (C–E♭–G–A♯). Rearranging and transposing, this gives A♭–C♭–E♭–F♯, a virtual minor version of the German sixth chord. Again like the typical +6, this enharmonic interpretation gives a resolution irregular for the minor seventh but normal for the augmented sixth, where the two voices at the enharmonic major second converge to a unison or diverge to an octave.

=== Half-diminished seventh as virtual augmented sixth chord ===
The half-diminished seventh chord is the inversion of the German sixth chord (it is its inversion as a set, rather than as a chord). Its interval of minor seventh (between root and seventh degree (i.e.: C–B♭ in C–E♭–G♭–B♭) can be written as an augmented sixth (C–E♭–G♭–A♯). Rearranging and transposing, this gives A♭–C♭–D–F♯, a virtual minor version of the French sixth chord. Like the typical +6, this enharmonic interpretation gives a resolution irregular for the half-diminished seventh but normal for the augmented sixth, where the two voices at the enharmonic major second converge to a unison or diverge to an octave.

== Tristan chord ==
Richard Wagner's Tristan chord, the first vertical sonority in his opera, Tristan und Isolde, can be interpreted as a half-diminished seventh that transitions to a French sixth in the key of A minor (F–A–B–D♯, in red below). The upper voice continues upward with a long appoggiatura (G♯ to A). Note that the D♯ resolves down to D♮ instead of up to E:

== See also ==
- Neapolitan chord
- Acoustic scale
