= Diminished seventh chord =

Type of musical chord

diminished seventh
Component intervals from root
- diminished seventh
- diminished fifth (tritone)
- minor third
- root

Tuning
- 125:150:180:216

Forte no. / Complement
- 4–28 / 8–28

The diminished seventh chord is a four-note chord (a seventh chord) composed of a root note, together with a minor third, a diminished fifth, and a diminished seventh above the root: (1, ♭3, ♭5, 7). For example, the diminished seventh chord built on B, commonly written as B^{o}^{7}, has pitches B-D-F-A♭:

The chord consists of a diminished triad plus the diminished seventh above the root. These four notes form a stack of three intervals which are all minor thirds. Since stacking yet another minor third returns to the root note, the four inversions of a diminished seventh chord are symmetrical. The integer notation is {0, 3, 6, 9}.

Since the diminished seventh interval is enharmonically equivalent to a major sixth, the chord is enharmonically equivalent to (1, ♭3, ♭5, ♮6). This may be labeled as a minor sixth chord with a flattened fifth.

The diminished seventh chord occurs as a leading-tone seventh chord in the harmonic minor scale. It typically has dominant function and contains two diminished fifths, which often resolve inwards.

The chord notation for the diminished seventh chord with C as the root is Cdim^{7} or C^{o}^{7} (or Cm^{6♭5} for the enharmonic variant). The notation Cdim or C^{o} normally denotes a (three-note) diminished triad, but some jazz charts or other music literature may intend for these to denote the four-note diminished seventh chord instead.

François-Joseph Fétis tuned the chord 10:12:14:17 (17-limit tuning).

== Analysis ==
Music theorists have struggled over the centuries to explain the meaning and function of diminished seventh chords. Currently, two approaches are generally used.

The less complex method treats the leading tone as the root of the chord and the other chord members as the third, fifth, and seventh of the chord, the same way other seventh chords are analyzed.

The other method is to analyze the chord as an "incomplete dominant ninth", that is a ninth chord with its root on the dominant, whose root is missing or implied. A vii^{o}^{7} chord in the minor key (for example, in C minor, B♮–D–F–A♭) occurs naturally in the harmonic minor scale and is equivalent to the dominant 7♭9 chord (G–B–D–F–A♭) without its root.

This was already proposed by Arnold Schoenberg, and Walter Piston championed this analysis. Jazz guitarist Sal Salvador, and other jazz theorists, also advocated this view, rewriting chord charts to reflect this and supplying the "missing" root as part of their bass lines. The dominant ninth theory was questioned by Heinrich Schenker. He explained that although there is a kinship between all univalent chords rising out of the fifth degree, the dominant ninth chord is not a real chord formation.

Jean-Philippe Rameau explained the diminished seventh chord as a dominant seventh chord whose supposed fundamental bass is borrowed from the sixth degree in minor, raised a semitone producing a stack of minor thirds. Thus, in C, the dominant seventh is G^{7} (G–B–D–F) and the sixth degree borrowed from the minor scale produces A♭–B–D–F.

In his Treatise on Harmony, he observed that three minor thirds and an augmented second make up a chord where the augmented second is such that "the ear is not offended" by it. He may have been talking of the augmented second in quarter-comma meantone, a tuning he favored, which is close to the just septimal minor third of 7:6.

== Function ==
=== Most common functions ===
Diminished seventh chord resolution: both diminished fifths tend to resolve inward, doubling the third of the tonic chord

The most common form of the diminished seventh chord is that rooted on the leading tone – for example, in the key of C, the chord (B–D–F–A♭) – so its other constituents are the,, and ♭ (flat submediant) scale degrees. These notes occur naturally in the harmonic minor scale. But this chord also appears in major keys, especially after the time of J.S. Bach, where it is borrowed from the parallel minor.

The chord possesses a dominant function when rooted on the leading tone (otherwise it does not, but can serve other functions - see below), and this is most straightforwardly shown when the root of a dominant seventh chord is omitted. The remaining third, fifth and seventh of that chord form a diminished triad (whose new root is the third of the former chord), to which a diminished seventh can be added. Thus, in C (major or minor), a dominant seventh chord consisting of G–B–D–F can be replaced by a diminished seventh chord B–D–F–A♭.

In jazz harmony, a combination of the dominant seventh chord with its substitute diminished seventh (with G in the bass and A♭ simultaneously in an upper voice) yields the seven flat-9 chord, which intensifies the dominant function of either a diminished seventh or dominant seventh chord. Other transformations of this kind facilitate a variety of substitutions and modulations: any of the four notes in a diminished seventh chord are raised by a semitone, that raised note is then the flat-seventh of a half-diminished seventh chord. Similarly, if any of the four notes in the diminished seventh chord are lowered by a semitone, that lowered note is then the root of a dominant seventh chord.

Diminished seventh chords may also be rooted on scale degrees other than the leading-tone, either as secondary function chords temporarily borrowed from other keys, or as appoggiatura chords: a chord rooted on the raised second scale degree (D♯–F♯–A–C in the key of C) acts as an appoggiatura to the tonic (C major) chord, and one rooted on the raised sixth scale degree (A♯–C♯–E–G in C major) acts as an appoggiatura to the dominant (G major) chord. Such chords however, having no leading tone in relation to the chords to which they resolve, cannot properly have a dominant function. They are therefore referred to commonly as non-dominant diminished seventh chords or common tone diminished seventh chords (see below).

In jazz, the diminished seventh chord is often based on the ♭ scale degree (the flat mediant) and acts as a passing chord between the mediant triad (or first-inversion tonic triad) and the supertonic triad: in C major, this would be the chord progression E minor – E♭ diminished – D minor. The chord, "plays no role in... jazz." The passing chord is used widely in Brazilian music such as choro, samba and bossa nova.

=== Other functions ===
A chord progression with a sharpened subdominant with diminished seventh chord

Another common use of the chord is as a sharpened subdominant with diminished seventh chord. This is represented by the Roman notation ♯iv^{o}^{7}, but in classical music is more correctly represented as vii^{o}^{7}/V, being a very common way for a composer to approach the dominant of any key. In the key of C, this is F♯dim^{7}. It is also a common chord in jazz and ragtime music. A common traditional jazz or Dixieland progression is IV–♯iv^{o}^{7}–V^{7} (in C major: F–F♯^{o}^{7}–G^{7}). Another common usage of ♯iv^{o}^{7} is often found in Gospel music and jazz progressions such as in the song "I Got Rhythm":

In C: | C C/E | F F♯dim^{7} | C/G A^{7} | Dm^{7} G^{7} |

One variant of the supertonic seventh chord is the supertonic diminished seventh with the raised supertonic, which is enharmonically equivalent to the lowered third (in C: D♯ = E♭). It may be used as a dominant substitute.

According to Benward and Saker, "The... [♯ii^{o} and ♯vi^{o}] chords are very common in 20th-century 'barbershop' quartet music." The music shows the chord progression IV–vi^{6}–Ger^{+6}–I ♯vi^{o}^{6}_{5}–V^{4}_{3}.
Example (B♯^{o}^{4}_{2}) in the Waltz of the Flowers (1892)

A diminished seventh chord may function as a common-tone diminished seventh chord. In this role, a diminished seventh chord resolves to a major or dominant seventh chord whose root is one of the notes of the diminished seventh chord (common tone), the most common being the raised supertonic seventh, which resolves to the tonic in major keys (♯ii^{o}^{7}–I, shown below) and the raised submediant, which resolves to dominant triad or seventh in major keys (♯vi^{o}^{7}–V, shown right), with the altered tones resolving upward by half step in both cases.

The ct^{o}^{7} chord, whose function, "is simply one of embellishment," most often spelled ♯ii^{o}^{7} when embellishing I or ♯vi^{o}^{7} when embellishing V, is distinguished from the vii^{o}^{7}/V chord by common tone chords resolving to I or I^{6} while vii^{o}^{7}/V resolves to V or I^{6}_{4}. They may be confused, due to enharmonic equivalency, but resolution is a better indicator of function than spelling. In C:

ct^{o}^{7}/I = d♯^{o}^{7} = D♯–F♯–A–C
vii^{o}^{7}/V = f♯^{o}^{7} = F♯–A–C–E♭ (= D♯)

The diminished chord may also resolve through lowering two of the chord tones producing a supertonic seventh chord (ii^{7}) that may lead to a conventional cadence:

== Expressive potential ==
During the Baroque era (1600–1750), European composers became aware of the expressive potential of the diminished seventh chord. In operas and other dramatic works, the chord was frequently used to heighten the sense of passion, anger, danger or mystery. One famous example can be found in J. S. Bach's St. Matthew Passion (1737), in which he sets verses from the Gospel of Matthew, chapter 27, verses 20–21: "But the chief priests and elders persuaded the multitude that they should ask Barabbas, and destroy Jesus. The governor [Pilate] answered and said unto them, 'Whether of the twain will ye that I release unto you?' They said, 'Barabbas'." Bach sets the text so that the angry multitude's harsh reply on the word Barabbam is a diminished seventh chord:

After Bach, diminished sevenths featured regularly in music to evoke the uncanny or a sense of impending danger. A powerful diminished seventh chord heralds the resurrection of the murdered Commendatore in the final scene of Mozart's Don Giovanni (1787). The dead man's statue comes to life and takes the Don down to Hell in one of the most chilling episodes in the entire operatic repertoire (Listen):

In the early years of the 19th century, composers used the diminished seventh with increasing frequency. In "Die Stadt", one of his darkest and most melancholy songs from Schwanengesang (1828), Franz Schubert conjures "the pianistic elaboration of a diminished seventh over an octave tremolo" to convey the sinister rippling of the oars as the protagonist is rowed across a lake towards the town where his lost beloved once lived. According to Edward T. Cone, "This famous arpeggiation seems to arise from nowhere to create an atmospheric prelude... and it dies away to nothing in a postlude." The song ends on the diminished seventh chord; there is no resolution, "the dissonance is terminal":

The operas of Carl Maria von Weber, particularly Der Freischütz and Euryanthe, featured many passages using this chord. The Wolf's Glen scene in Der Freischütz (1821) is an example.

Wolf's Glen music from Der Freischütz (orchestra only)

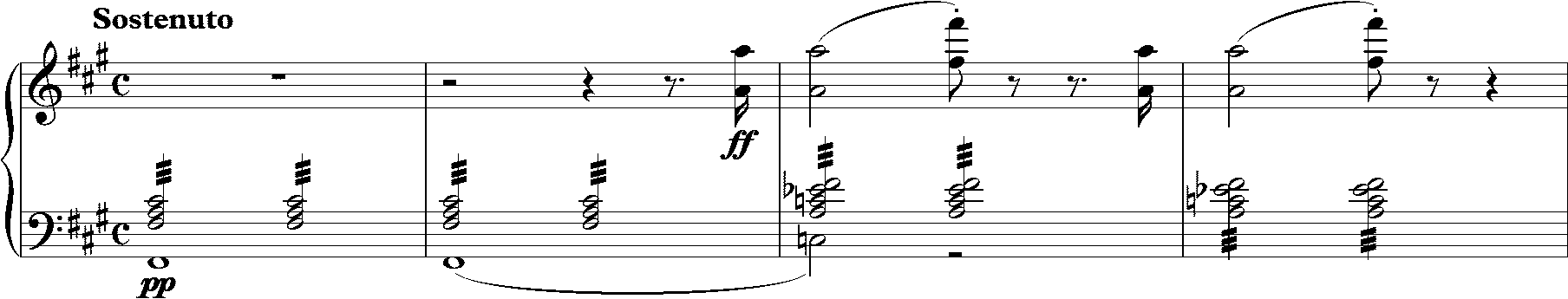
Wolf's Glen music from Der Freischütz (orchestra only)

According to his early biographer, Alexander Wheelock Thayer, Ludwig van Beethoven spoke disparagingly of the 'accumulation of diminished seventh chords' in Euryanthe (1823).

Beethoven was himself rather fond of the chord and was well aware of its dramatic potential. Perhaps the clearest instance of the diminished seventh's power to evoke mystery and terror can be found in the passage linking the two final movements of Beethoven's Appassionata sonata, Op. 57 (1806). The placid conclusion of the andante movement is interrupted first by a slowly rolled diminished seventh arpeggio played pianissimo, followed by the same chord played an octave above in a sharp, stabbing fortissimo.

The final movement of Hector Berlioz's Symphonie Fantastique reflects the influence of Weber in its copious use of diminished seventh chords to evoke the spooky atmosphere of a Witch's Sabbath: "a sinister gathering of spectres, monsters and weird, infernal mocking creatures":

Berlioz's Symphonie Fantastique finale, bars 1–4

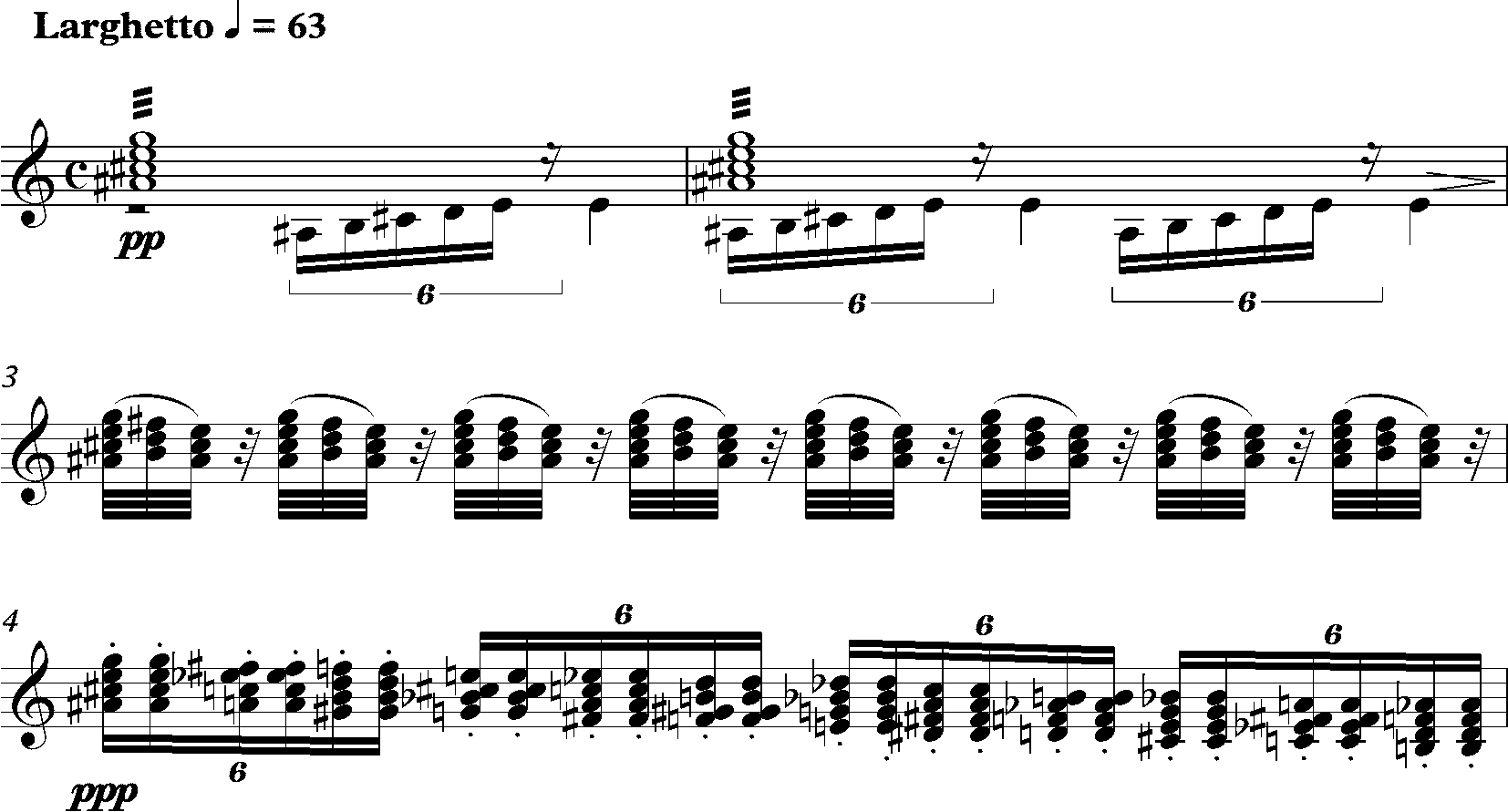
Berlioz's Symphonie Fantastique finale, bars 1-4

By the end of the 19th century, composers had used the diminished seventh so much that it became a cliché of musical expression and consequently lost much its power to shock and thrill. By the turn of the 20th century, many musicians were getting weary of it. In his Harmonielehre (1911), Arnold Schoenberg wrote:

Whenever one wanted to express pain, excitement, anger, or some other strong feeling – there we find, almost exclusively, the diminished seventh chord. So it is in the music of Bach, Haydn, Mozart, Beethoven, Weber, etc. Even in Wagner's early works it plays the same role. But soon the role was played out. This uncommon, restless, undependable guest, here today, gone tomorrow, settled down, became a citizen, was retired a philistine. The chord had lost that appeal of novelty, hence, it had lost its sharpness, but also its luster. It had nothing more in say to a new era. Thus, it fell from the higher sphere of art music to the lower of music for entertainment. There it remains, as a sentimental expression of sentimental concerns. It became banal and effeminate.

== Symmetry ==
The same four pitch classes spelled as four different diminished seventh chords: G♯dim^{7}, Bdim^{7}, Ddim^{7}, and Fdim^{7}.

Because a diminished seventh chord is composed of three stacked minor thirds which evenly divide the chromatic scale, it is symmetrical and its four inversions are composed of the same pitch classes. Understanding what inversion a given diminished seventh chord is written in (and thus finding its root) depends on its enharmonic spelling. For example, G♯dim^{7} (G♯–B–D–F) is enharmonically equivalent to three other inverted diminished chords with roots on the other three pitches in the chord:

1. Bdim^{7} (A♭–B–D–F)
2. Ddim^{7} (A♭–C♭–D–F)
3. Fdim^{7} (A♭–C♭–E–F)

Nineteenth-century composers in particular often make use of this enharmonic to use these chords for modulations. Percy Goetschius calls it the "enharmonic chord."

Two diminished seventh chords in the octatonic scale (one red, one blue) may be rearranged as the alpha chord

Given the symmetry of the chord (and ignoring enharmonic spelling), it follows that there are only three distinct diminished seventh chords (as opposed to twelve), each a conflation of four enharmonic equivalents. Using Piston's incomplete-ninth analysis discussed above, a single diminished seventh chord, without enharmonic change, is capable of the following analyses: V, V/ii, V/III (in minor), V/iii (in major), V/iv, V/V, V/VI (in minor), V/vi (in major), V/VII (in minor). Since the chord may be enharmonically written in four different ways without changing the sound, the above can be multiplied by four, yielding a total of forty-eight possible interpretations. More conservatively, each assumed root may be used as a dominant, tonic, or supertonic, giving twelve possibilities.

The octatonic scale (or diminished scale), a symmetric scale, may be conceived of as two interlocking diminished seventh chords, which may be rearranged into the alpha chord.

== Diminished seventh chord table ==
Chord	Root	Minor third	Dim. fifth	Dim. seventh
C♭^{o}^{7}	C♭	E (D)	G (F)	B (A♭)
C^{o}^{7}	C	E♭	G♭	B (A)
C♯^{o}^{7}	C♯	E	G	B♭
D♭^{o}^{7}	D♭	F♭ (E)	A (G)	C (B♭)
D^{o}^{7}	D	F	A♭	C♭ (B)
D♯^{o}^{7}	D♯	F♯	A	C
E♭^{o}^{7}	E♭	G♭	B (A)	D (C)
E^{o}^{7}	E	G	B♭	D♭
E♯^{o}^{7}	E♯	G♯	B	D
F♭^{o}^{7}	F♭	A (G)	C (B♭)	E (D♭)
F^{o}^{7}	F	A♭	C♭(B)	E(D)
F♯^{o}^{7}	F♯	A	C	E♭
G♭^{o}^{7}	G♭	B (A)	D (C)	F (E♭)
G^{o}^{7}	G	B♭	D♭	F♭ (E)
G♯^{o}^{7}	G♯	B	D	F
A♭^{o}^{7}	A♭	C♭ (B)	E (D)	G (F)
A^{o}^{7}	A	C	E♭	G♭
A♯^{o}^{7}	A♯	C♯	E	G
B♭^{o}^{7}	B♭	D♭	F♭ (E)	A (G)
B^{o}^{7}	B	D	F	A♭
B♯^{o}^{7}	B♯	D♯	F♯	A

== See also ==
- Enharmonic scale
- Diminished seventh interval
- Leading tone seventh chord
- Irregular resolution
- Half diminished chord
- Subtonic
- Triad (music)
- Tritone
- Seventh chord
- Close and open harmony
- Harmony
- Octatonic scale
