= Sixth chord =

Chord where extra pitch is a sixth above the root

Sixth chord is the common name for any added tone chord where the extra pitch is a sixth above the root. The term also applies to three-note chords with a sixth and a third above the root, a configuration commonly known as first inversion. In chromatic music, augmented sixth chords are important tools.

== Background ==
15th century music often featured parallel sixths in practices like Fauxbourdon. As figured bass evolved, the figure '6' indicated a three-note structure with a sixth and a third above the bass note. As functional harmony evolved, this became known as the first inversion of a chord.

In the 18th century, Jean-Philippe Rameau diagnosed these chords as sixte ajoutée, because the sixth scale degree had been added to the root, third, and fifth of a normal triad. Rameau's analysis focused on the contrapuntal motion in cadences of the added sixth in subdominant chords. Added tone chords are harmonically ambiguous, as the root can also be heard as the third in the first inversion of a seventh chord.

Common versions of added sixth chords are the major sixth, minor sixth, and minor flat sixth.

=== Major sixth ===
The major sixth chord is a diatonic chord where the sixth scale degree is added to the major triad. On a C major chord, the added sixth is an A and the additional sixth interval is major.

The chord symbol is usually C^{6}. Because it is also an A minor seventh chord in first inversion, it is tonally ambiguous. Identifying the root depends on context.

=== Minor sixth ===
The minor sixth chord (sometimes: minor major sixth, or minor/major sixth) consists of a minor triad with a tone added a major sixth above the root. Thus in C, it contains the notes C, E♭, G, and A.

This chord might be notated Cm^{6}, Cm^{M6}, Cmin/maj^{6}, Cmin^{(maj6)}, etc. Note that Cm^{6} has the same notes as F^{9} with the root omitted, i.e. the notes F (omitted), A, E♭, C, and G. These notes form a tetrad with several enharmonic equivalents: C–E♭–G–A might be written as Cm^{6}, F^{9}, F^{9} (no root), Am^{7♭5}, B^{7♭9}, A♭^{Maj7♭9}, or B^{alt}. Many jazz chord charts use these chord notations indiscriminately, particularly in the choice of minor sixth versus dominant ninth chords. Thus, in some cases when a Cm^{6} is indicated, the F^{9} is in fact a better harmonic choice, i.e. closer to the composer's harmonic intent; or vice versa. Analysis of the movement of the root, in the presence of dominant-functioning harmonies, will generally indicate which enharmonic chord is the appropriate notation choice. In some cases, the harmony is ambiguous.

Just like the minor is to the major, the minor sixth can be considered to be similarly related to the dominant seventh.

Unlike the major sixth chord which is often substituted for a major triad, the minor sixth is more versatile and plays a number of different harmonic roles due to its identity as an inversion of the half-diminished seventh chord. The presence of the perfect fifth interval over the root also means that this voicing is more stable than the half-diminished seventh chord. An extension of the concepts of major and minor to tetrads, referred to as otonality and utonality respectively, considers this chord to be the utonality to the dominant seventh chord.

=== Minor flat sixth ===
The minor flat sixth chord is a minor triad and the additional sixth interval is minor, which is referred to as a flat sixth. Thus in C, it contains the notes C, E♭, G, and A♭.

This chord might be notated Cm^{♭6}. It also shares identity as an inversion of the major seventh chord.

== In popular music ==
Instances of the sixth chord crop up in popular music towards the end of the 19th century, for example in Johann Strauss II’s "The Blue Danube" waltz. Richard Taruskin sees Strauss’s use of the added sixth chord as the “one stylistic idiosyncrasy… that went from him into the general idiom of European (or European-style) music, and that is the freedom with which the sixth degree of the scale is harmonized.”

Johann Strauss II, the Blue Danube Waltz

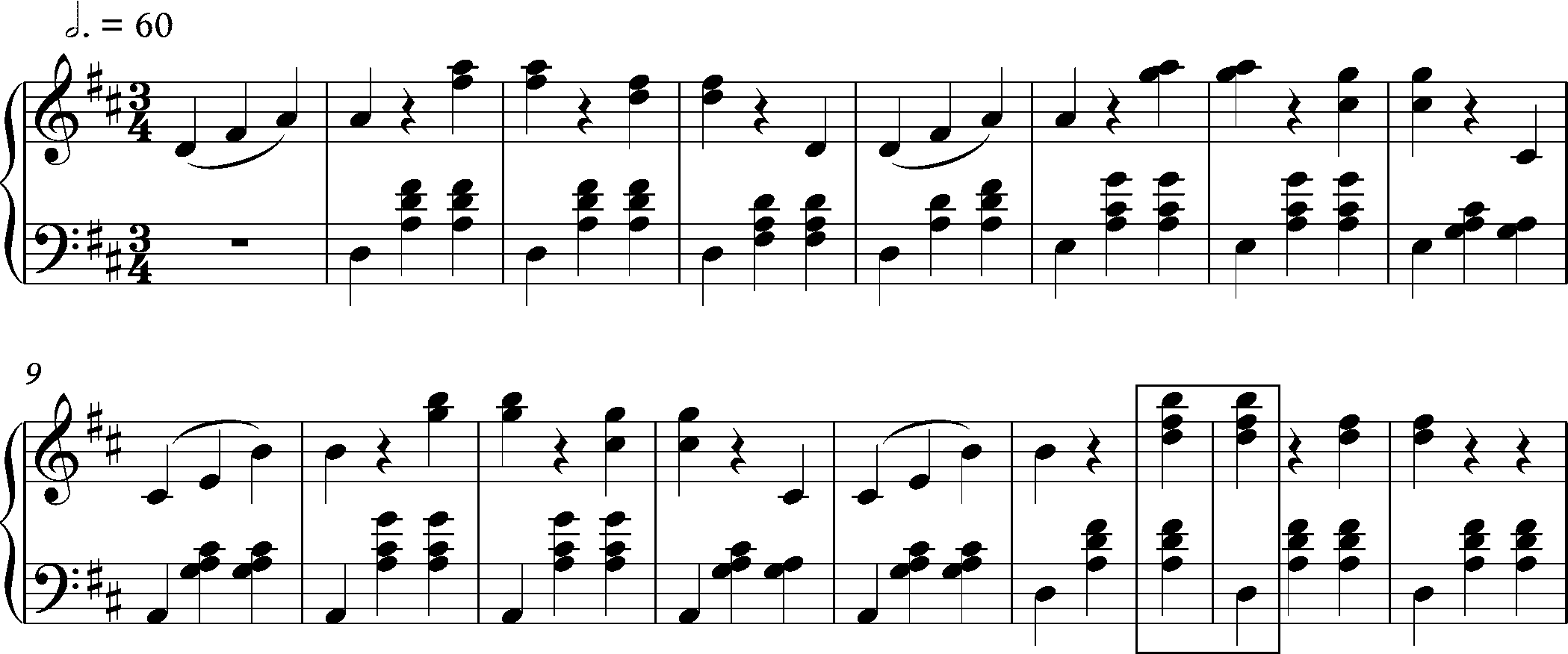
Strauss Blue Danube

The sixth chord was a common feature of the harmony of jazz and popular music during the entire twentieth century. One of the attractions of the chord is its tonal ambiguity. The harmony contains within it aspects that are both major and minor. Kurt Weill’s song "Mack the Knife" from the Threepenny Opera (1928) uses the chord from the start, resulting in "a sort of bitonality: A minor in the melody, C major in the harmony."

The trombone riff that opens Glenn Miller’s "Tuxedo Junction" (1940) is a well-known example from the Swing era. Later popular songs that feature sixth chords include: The Beatles' "She Loves You" (1963), "Help!" (1965) and "The Fool on the Hill" (1967), Arthur Kent and Sylvia Dee's "Bring Me Sunshine" (1968), The Young Rascals' "Groovin'" (1967), Queen's "Bohemian Rhapsody" (1975), Steely Dan's "Bad Sneakers" (1975) and Styx's "Babe" (1979).

The minor flat sixth chord is arpeggiated in the first chord of the dungeon music from the first Legend of Zelda game.

== In classical music ==
An unusual use of this chord at the start of a work occurs in Beethoven’s Piano Sonata in E♭ major, Op 31 No. 3 (1802):

Beethoven Sonata in E♭, Op 31 No 3 opening

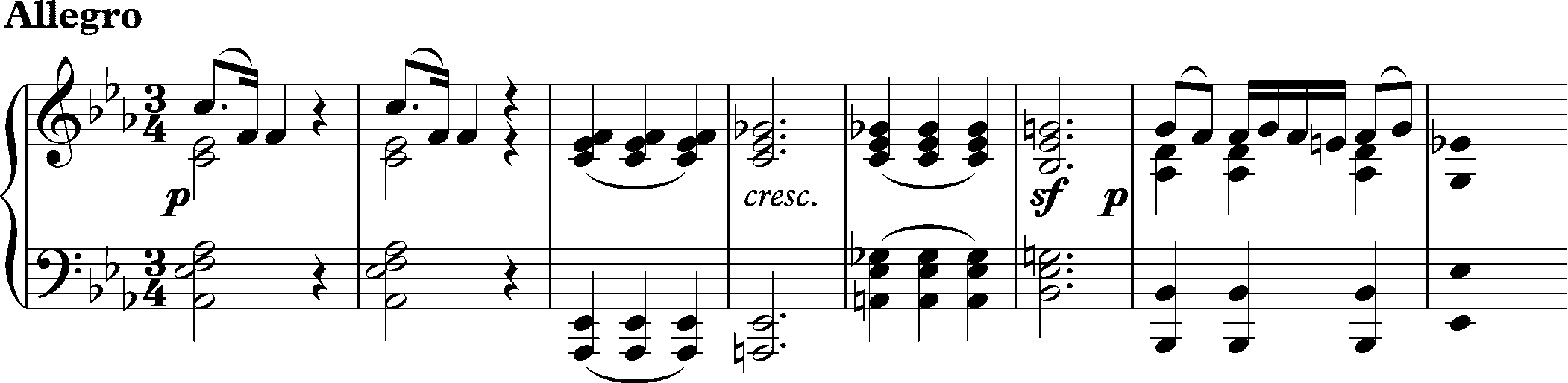
Beethoven Sonata in E♭, Op 31 No 3 opening

According to Denis Matthews, "the most striking moment in the sonata is its opening, where an ambiguous added-sixth chord on the subdominant resolves itself through a series of halting steps, rhythmically and harmonically, towards the tonic."

In the opening section of his Fantasy-Overture, Romeo and Juliet, Tchaikovsky uses the minor added sixth chord to striking effect:

Tchaikovsky Romeo & Juliet bars 28-33

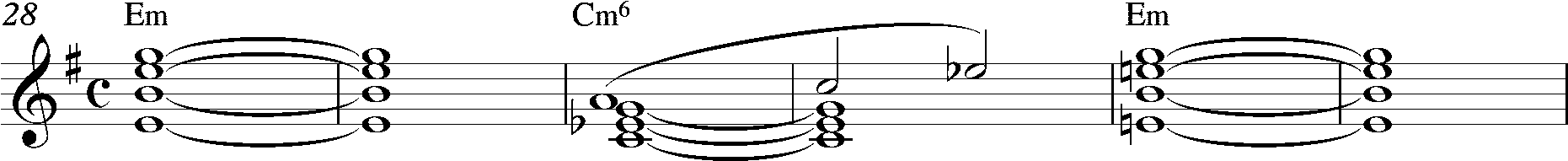
Tchaikovsky Romeo & Juliet bars 28-33

Debussy frequently used the sixth chord, for example in his piano prelude General Lavine-Eccentric (1913), whose idiom alludes to the popular idioms of cakewalk and ragtime of the early 1900s. The following passage "is in F major; its seeming pentatonicism (C–D–F–G–A) is found to be the outline of the tonic added sixth chord, plus the G as passing tone…"

Debussy, from 'General Lavine - eccentric'

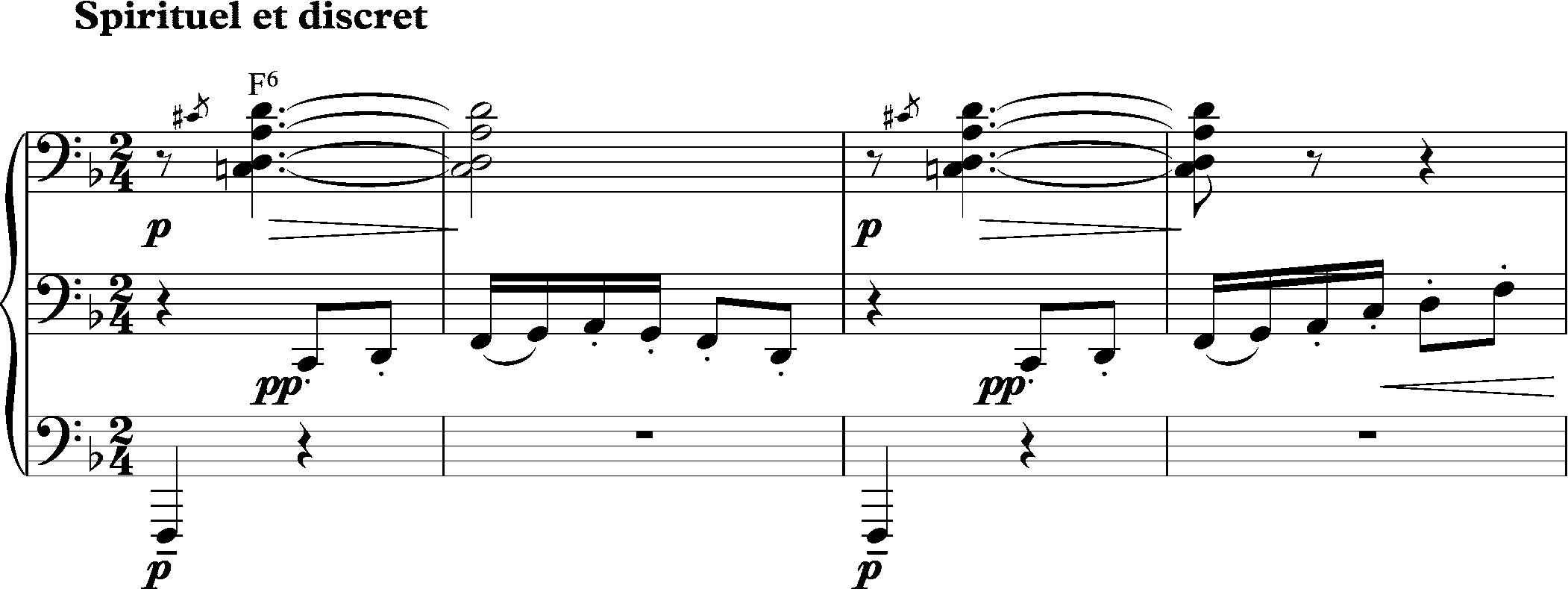
Debussy, from 'General Lavine - eccentric'

Maurice Ravel’s 1920 ballet La Valse, which contains subtle echoes of the late 19th century Viennese Waltz, incorporates added sixth chords in its harmony:

From Ravel, La Valse

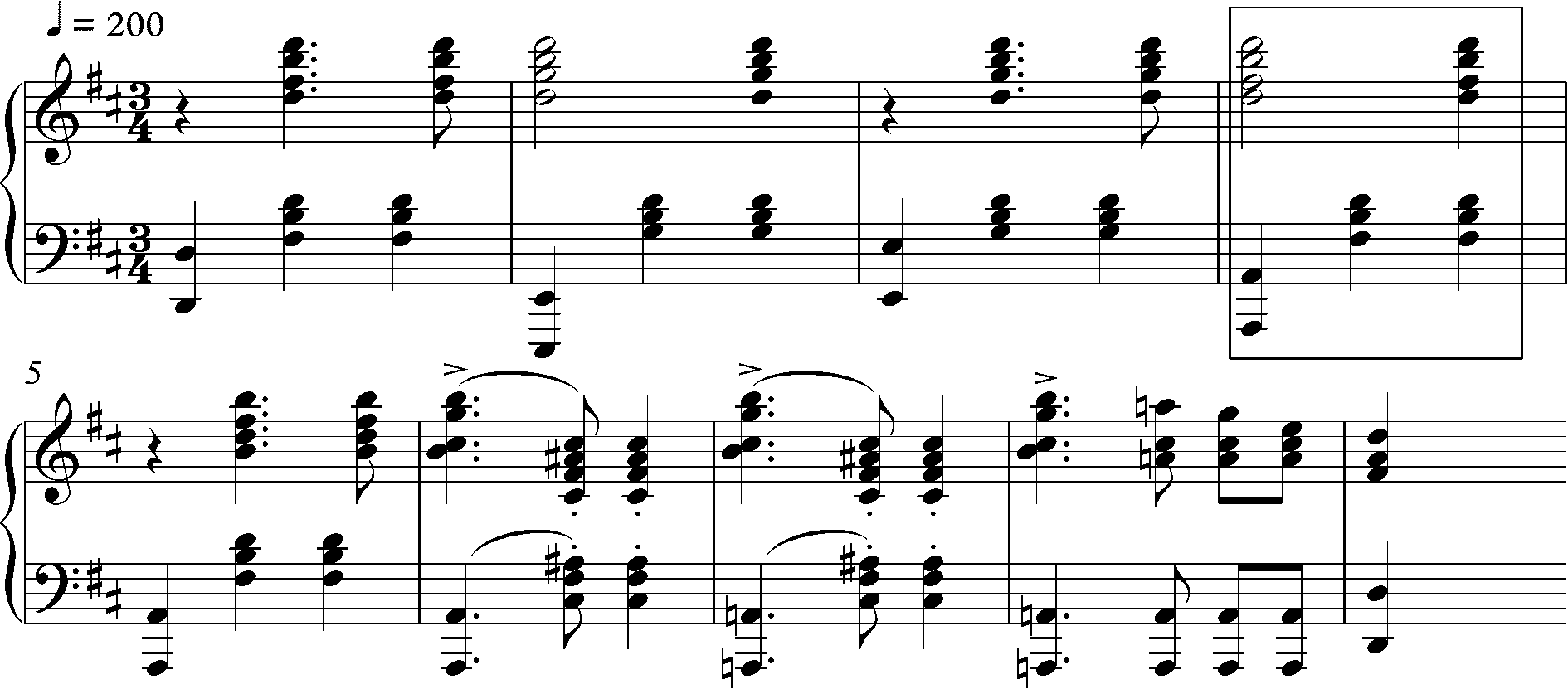
From Ravel, La Valse

The timeless, meditative closing bars of Gustav Mahler’s song "Abschied" from Das Lied von der Erde (1909) fully exploit the expressive power and ambiguity of the sixth chord. "The final sonority, the famous added-sixth chord, is particularly ingenious... because it fuses the two principal keys of Das Lied (A minor and C major)."

Mahler, Das Lied von der Erde, final chord

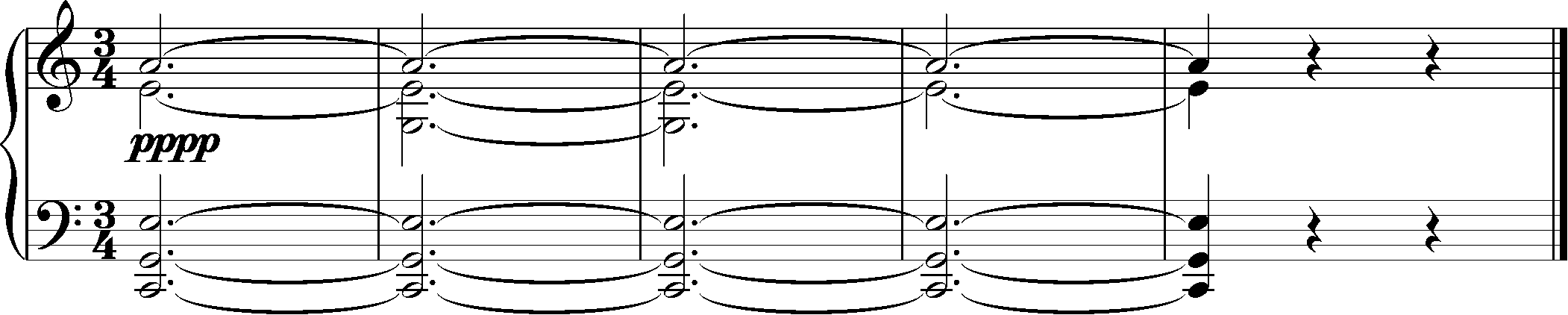
Mahler, Das Lied von der Erde, final chord

Alban Berg’s Violin Concerto (1935) ends with a "tonic triad of B flat, with added sixth [that] follows a harmonic progression found frequently in 1930s dance-band arrangements." However, Richard Taruskin points out that Berg's "chord thus created, B flat, D, F, G had an important poetic resonance", as it echoes the ending of Mahler's "Abschied." Stravinsky’s Symphony in Three Movements (1945) "incorporates elements of American popular music, most famously the final chord, a Hollywood added-sixth chord of ever there was one." (Stravinsky himself later criticized his choice of the final D♭ sixth chord as ‘commercial.’) Messiaen’s "Louange à l’immortalité de Jésus", the final movement of his Quartet for the End of Time (1941) opens with a meditative theme "played entirely over a 6-4 chord with added sixth"

== See also ==
- 6/9 chord
- Augmented sixth chord
- thirteenth chord
