= Minor plagal cadence =

Musical cadence

F minor chord (pictured) resolving to C.

A minor plagal cadence is a type of plagal cadence which uses a minor iv instead of the typical major IV before resolving to the I chord. This cadence is often considered to evoke a nostalgic or bittersweet sound. Because the iv minor chord is not diatonic to the major key, it is also an example of modal interchange with the parallel minor key. The minor plagal cadence was recognized as early as the 1670s, with Wolfgang Caspar Printz coining the term clausula formalis perfecta dissecta acquiescens (dissected acquiescent perfect formal close) to describe the cadence. The minor plagal cadence often follows a major IV chord, creating an IV-iv-I progression that makes use of voice-leading.

== Function ==
The minor plagal cadence can be seen as having a dominant function, similar to an authentic cadence. Just as the V chord contains a leading tone resolving by a half-step to a note in the tonic chord—in this case, the 7th scale degree resolving to the 1st—the minor plagal cadence also includes such a leading-tone resolution in its ♭6–♮6 harmonic motion. This notion is particularly common in inverse harmony, in which a V7 chord "inverted" about an axis of symmetry between the tonic and dominant scale degrees produces an iv6 chord.

== Use ==
The minor plagal cadence appears in many popular songs, including "Space Oddity" by David Bowie, "Don't Look Back in Anger" by Oasis, and "Crying" by Roy Orbison. It is especially used in Christmas music to evoke a sentimental or wistful feeling, such as in Irving Berlin's "White Christmas" or Mariah Carey's "All I Want For Christmas Is You". It is also used in "romantic"-sounding, bittersweet film scores such as "Leia's Theme" from Star Wars, composed by John Williams, and Moonraker, composed by John Barry.

== Variations and similar progressions ==
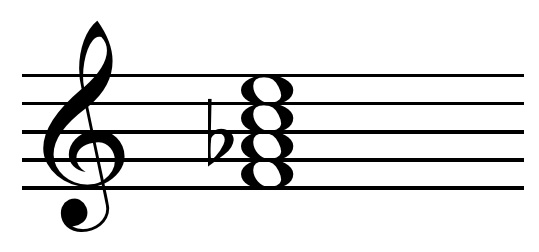
F minor major seventh chord (pictured) resolving to C.

The minor-major seventh version of the iv chord is often used in major-key songs, such as "It's My Party" by Lesley Gore, "Magical Mystery Tour" by The Beatles, and "Vision of Love" by Mariah Carey. The minor 6th version of the iv chord (which can also be interpreted as an inverted ii half-diminished seventh chord) is also frequently used in place of the iv minor triad. This chord possesses a dissonant tritone interval, which adds to the strength of the resolution. This variation of the minor plagal cadence is used in songs such as "Autumn Leaves" and "Stella By Starlight". Although not truly a minor plagal cadence, the ♭VII7–I cadence can function similarly to a minor plagal cadence, as it contains the root and third of the minor iv.
