= Tendency tone =

Note which resolves a semitone

In this example, the leading tone of C major (B) resolves to the tonic (C) in a perfect authentic cadence.

In music theory, a tendency tone (or active tone) is a note or pitch which resolves or "tends" to a note one semitone higher or lower, being an ascending and descending tendency tone respectively.

The most commonly used tendency tone is the major seventh resolving to the tonic, which has a special name of leading tone (also called subsemitone or leading note). A leading-tone triad is a triad built on the seventh scale degree in a major key (vii^{o} in Roman numeral analysis), while a leading-tone seventh chord is a seventh chord built on the seventh scale degree (vii^{ø}^{7}). Walter Piston considers and notates vii^{o} as V^{0}_{7}, an incomplete dominant seventh chord. (For the Roman numeral notation of these chords, see Roman numeral analysis.)

== Leading tone ==
The leading tone refers to the seventh scale degree of the major scale, which has a strong affinity for and leads melodically to the tonic. It is sung as si in movable-do solfège. For example, in the F major scale, the leading note is the note E.

As a diatonic function, the leading tone is the seventh scale degree of any diatonic scale when the distance between it and the tonic is a single semitone. In diatonic scales in which there is a whole tone between the seventh scale degree and the tonic, such as the Mixolydian mode, the seventh degree is called the subtonic. However, in modes without a leading tone, such as Dorian and Mixolydian, a raised seventh is often featured during cadences, such as in the harmonic minor scale.

A leading tone outside of the current scale is called a secondary leading tone, leading to a secondary tonic. It functions to briefly tonicize a scale tone (usually the 5th degree) as part of a secondary dominant chord. In the second measure of Beethoven's Waldstein Sonata (shown below), the F♯'s function as secondary leading tones, which resolve to G in the next measure.

== Leading-tone triad ==
A leading-tone chord is a triad built on the seventh scale degree in major and the raised seventh-scale-degree in minor. The quality of the leading-tone triad is diminished in both major and minor keys. For example, in both C major and C minor, it is a B diminished triad (though it is usually written in first inversion, as described below).

According to John Bunyan Herbert, (who uses the term "subtonic", which later came to usually refer to a seventh scale degree pitched a whole tone below the tonic note),

The subtonic [leading-tone] chord is founded upon seven (the leading tone) of the major key, and is a diminished chord... The subtonic chord is very much neglected by many composers, and possibly a little overworked by others. Its occasional use gives character and dignity to a composition. On the whole, the chord has a poor reputation. Its history, in brief, seems to be: Much abused and little used.

=== Function ===
The leading-tone triad is used in several functions. It is commonly used as a passing chord between a root position tonic triad and a first inversion tonic triad: that is, "In addition to its basic function of passing between I and I^{6}, VII^{6} has another important function: it can form a neighboring chord to I or I^{6}." In that instance, the leading-tone triad prolongs tonic through neighbor and passing motion. The example below shows two measures from the fourth movement of Beethoven's Piano Sonata No. 3 in C major, Op. 2 in which a leading-tone triad functions as a passing chord between I and I^{6}.

The leading-tone triad may also be regarded as an incomplete dominant seventh chord: "A chord is called 'Incomplete' when its root is omitted. This omission occurs, occasionally, in the chord of the dom.-seventh, and the result is a triad upon the leading tone."

A leading-tone triad (beat 4) and secondary leading-tone triad (beat 6) in the first phrase of the Bach chorale "Gott der Vater, wohn' uns bei" (slightly simplified)

Some sources say the chord is not a chord; some argue it is an incomplete dominant seventh chord, especially when the diminished triad is written in its first inversion (resembling a second inversion dominant seventh without a root):

The subtonic [i.e. leading-tone] chord is a very common chord and a useful one. The triad differs in formation from the preceding six [major and minor diatonic] triads. It is dissonant and active... a diminished triad. The subtonic chord belongs to the dominant family. The factors of the triad are the same tones as the three upper factors of the dominant seventh chord and progress in the same manner. These facts have led many theorists to call this triad a 'dominant seventh chord without root.'... The subtonic chord in both modes has suffered much criticism from theorists although it has been and is being used by masters. It is criticized as being 'overworked', and that much can be accomplished with it with a minimum of technique.

For example, vii^{o}^{6} often substitutes for V^{4}_{3}, which it closely resembles, and its use may be required in situations by voice leading: "In a strict four-voice texture, if the bass is doubled by the soprano, the VII^{6} [vii^{o}^{6}] is required as a substitute for the V^{4}_{3}".

=== Voice leading ===
Since the leading-tone triad is a diminished triad, it is usually found in its first inversion: According to Carl Edward Gardner, "The first inversion of the triad is considered, by many, preferable to root position. The second inversion of the triad is unusual. Some theorists forbid its use."

In a four-part chorale texture, the third of the leading-tone triad is doubled in order to avoid adding emphasis on the tritone created by the root and the fifth. Unlike a dominant chord where the leading tone can be frustrated and not resolve to the tonic if it is in an inner voice, the leading tone in a leading-tone triad must resolve to the tonic. Commonly, the fifth of the triad resolves down since it is phenomenologically similar to the seventh in a dominant seventh chord. All in all, the tritone resolves inward if it is written as a diminished fifth (m. 1 below) and outward if it is written as an augmented fourth (m. 2).

== Leading-tone seventh chord ==
Leading-tone seventh chords (with suspensions) functioning as dominant chords in Beethoven's Piano Sonata No. 5, mvmt. I.

The leading-tone seventh chords are vii^{ø}^{7} and vii^{o}^{7}, the half-diminished and diminished seventh chords on the seventh scale degree of the major and harmonic minor. For example, in C major and C minor, the leading-tone seventh chords are B half-diminished (B–D–F–A) and B diminished (B–D–F–A♭), respectively.

Leading-tone seventh chords were not characteristic of Renaissance music but are typical of the Baroque and Classical period. They are used more freely in Romantic music but began to be used less in classical music as conventions of tonality broke down. They are integral to ragtime and contemporary popular and jazz music genres.

Composers throughout the common practice period often employed modal mixture when using the leading-tone seventh chord in a major key, allowing for the substitution of the half-diminished seventh chord with the fully diminished seventh chord (by lowering its seventh). This mixture is commonly used when the leading-tone seventh chord is functioning as a secondary leading-tone chord.

The example below shows fully diminished seventh chords in the key of D major in the right hand in the third movement of Mozart's Piano Sonata No. 5 in G major.

=== Function ===
The leading-tone seventh chord has a dominant function and may be used in place of V or V^{7}. Just as vii^{o} is sometimes considered an incomplete dominant seventh chord, a leading-tone seventh chord is often considered a "dominant ninth chord without root".)

For variety, leading-tone seventh chords are frequently substituted for dominant chords, with which they have three common tones: "The seventh chord founded upon the subtonic [in major]... is occasionally used. It resolves directly to the tonic... This chord may be employed without preparation."

=== Voice leading ===
In contrast to leading-tone triads, leading-tone seventh chords appear in root position. The example below shows leading-tone seventh chords (in root position) functioning as dominants in a reduction of Mozart's Don Giovanni, K. 527, act 1, scene 13.

François-Joseph Fétis tunes the leading-tone seventh in major 5:6:7:9.

== Other tendency tones ==
The ascending (M7, TT) and descending (m2, m6) tendency tones which resolve to the tonic or dominant.

Other notes which ascend or descend a semitone to the tonic or dominant are listed in the table below:

	Ascending	Descending
to Tonic	M7→P1	m2→P1
to Dominant	A4→P5	m6→P5

The brightness or darkness of the modes of the diatonic scale can be attributed to the number of tendency tones as elaborated below.

=== Ascending ===
Other than the seventh scale degree, the raised fourth (♯) scale degree is another ascending, or lower, tendency tone as it resolves up to the dominant.

Comparing the major modes of the diatonic scale, the Lydian mode has 2 ascending tendency tones, the Ionian mode has 1, and the Mixolydian mode has 0:

Major modes	M7→P1	A4→P5
Lydian	✓	✓
Ionian	✓	
Mixolydian		

=== Descending ===
Cadence featuring a descending tendency tone (B♭–A in the bass voice) from a well-known 16th-century lamentation, the debate over which was documented in Rome c.1540.

Descending tendency tone trill

Diatonic trill

A descending, or upper, tendency tone is a tendency tone that resolves down. The descending tendency tone usually is a lowered second degree (♭) resolving to the tonic, but the expression may at times refer to a lowered sixth degree (♭) resolving to the dominant. In German, the term Gegenleitton ("counter tendency tone") is used by Hugo Riemann to denote the descending tendency tone (♭), but Heinrich Schenker uses abwärtssteigenden Leitton ("descending tendency tone") to mean the descending diatonic supertonic (♮).)

The tritone substitution, chord progression ii–subV–I on C (Dm–D♭^{7}–C), results in a descending tendency note.

Comparing the minor modes of the diatonic scale, the Dorian mode has 0 descending tendency tones, the Aeolian mode has 1, and the Phrygian mode has 2:

Minor modes	m6→P5	m2→P1
Dorian		
Aeolian	✓	
Phrygian	✓	✓

=== Miscellaneous ===
According to Ernst Kurth, the major and minor thirds contain "latent" tendencies towards the perfect fourth and whole tone, respectively, and thus establish tonality. However, Carl Dahlhaus contests Kurth's position, holding that this drive is in fact created through or with harmonic function, a root progression in another voice by a whole tone or fifth, or melodically (monophonically) by the context of the scale. For example, the tendency tone of alternating C chord and F minor chords is either the note E leading to F (if F is tonic), or A♭ leading to G (if C is tonic).

Forte claims that the leading tone is only one example of a more general tendency: the strongest progressions, melodic and harmonic, are by half step. He suggests that one play a G major scale and stop on the seventh note (F♯) to personally experience the feeling of lack caused by the "particularly strong attraction" of the seventh note to the eighth (F♯→G'), thus its name.

== See also ==
- Musica ficta
