= Half-diminished seventh chord =

Type of chord in music theory

half-diminished seventh chord
Component intervals from root
- minor seventh
- diminished fifth (tritone)
- minor third
- root

Tuning
- 5:6:7:9 or 25:30:36:45

Forte no. / Complement
- 4-27 / 8-27

In music theory, the half-diminished seventh chord (also known as a half-diminished chord or a minor seventh flat five chord) is a seventh chord composed of a root note, together with a minor third, a diminished fifth, and a minor seventh (1, ♭3, ♭5, ♭7). For example, the half-diminished seventh chord built on B, commonly written as Bm7(♭5), B^{ø}^{7} or B^{ø}, has pitches B-D-F-A:

It can be represented by the integer notation {0, 3, 6, 10}.

The half-diminished seventh chord exists in root position and in three inversions. The first inversion is enharmonic to a minor sixth chord:

Half-diminished chord inversions

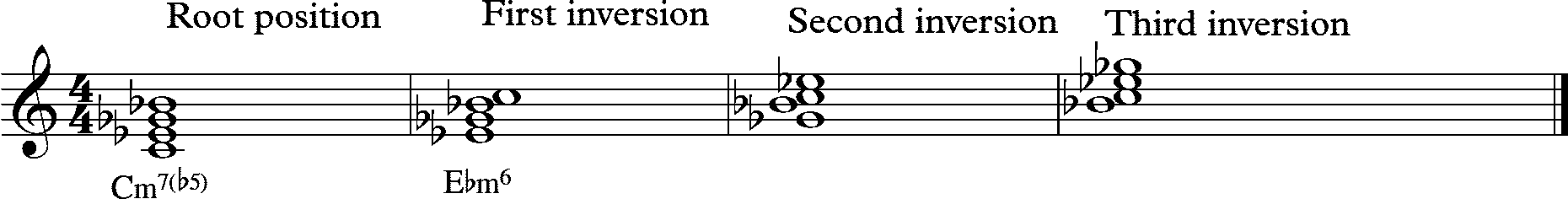
Half-diminished chord inversions

In diatonic harmony, the half-diminished seventh chord occurs naturally on the seventh scale degree of any major scale (for example, B^{ø}^{7} in C major) and is thus a leading-tone seventh chord in the major mode. Similarly, the chord also occurs on the second degree of any natural minor scale (e.g., D^{ø}^{7} in C minor). It has been described as a "considerable instability".

A half-diminished chord can be added to a note four semitones below the tonic to form a Dominant ninth chord.

== Expressive potential ==
The half-diminished seventh chord is frequently used in passages that convey heightened emotion. For example, the "mournful affect" of the sombre opening Chorus of J. S. Bach's St Matthew Passion (1727) features the chord on the seventh beat of its first bar and on the first beat of its third bar:

Bach, St Matthew Passion, opening

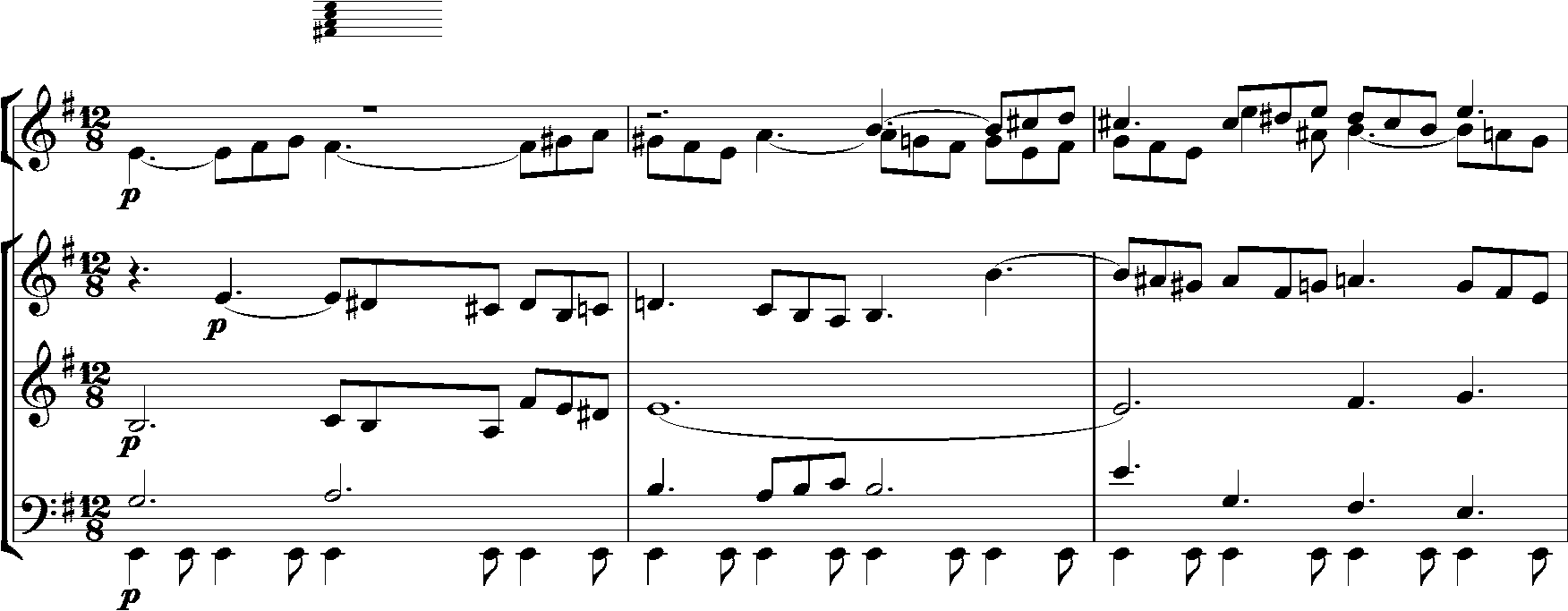
Bach, St Matthew Passion, opening

Similarly in the Et incarnatus est section from Michael Haydn's Missa Sancti Nicolai Tolentini (1768):

Et incarnatus est on YouTube from Michael Haydn's Missa Sancti Nicolai Tolentini, MH 109 performed by Le Choeur de Filles de la Maîtrise de Bordeaux

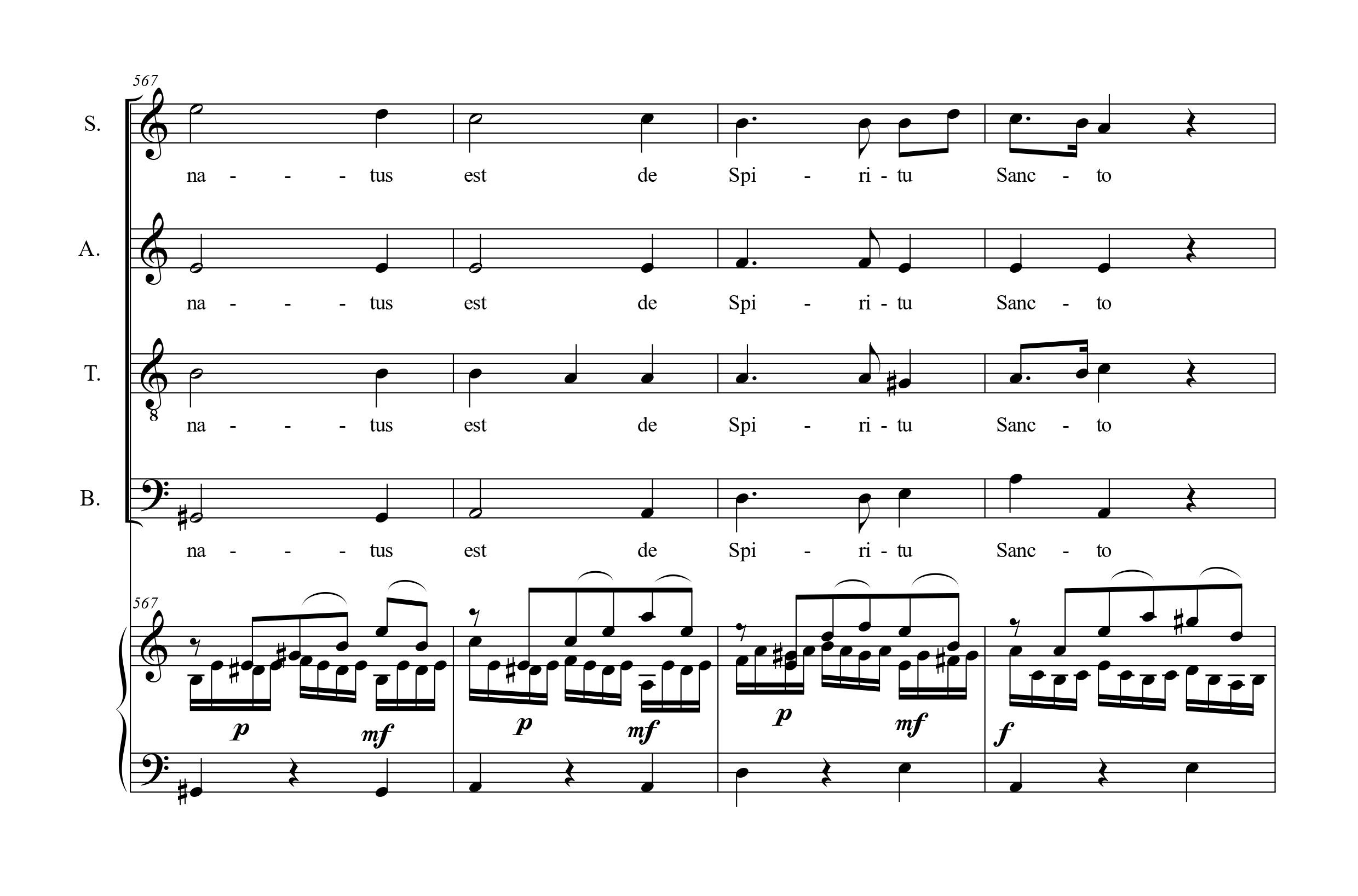
Et incarnatus est from Michael Haydn's Missa Sancti Nicolai Tolentini (1768)

In contrast, however, one of the most striking and best known examples of a half diminished seventh can be found in a piece that expresses joyful celebration, namely the chord that follows the fanfare at the start of the Wedding March from Mendelssohn's incidental music to A Midsummer Night's Dream (1842).

Mendelssohn, Wedding March

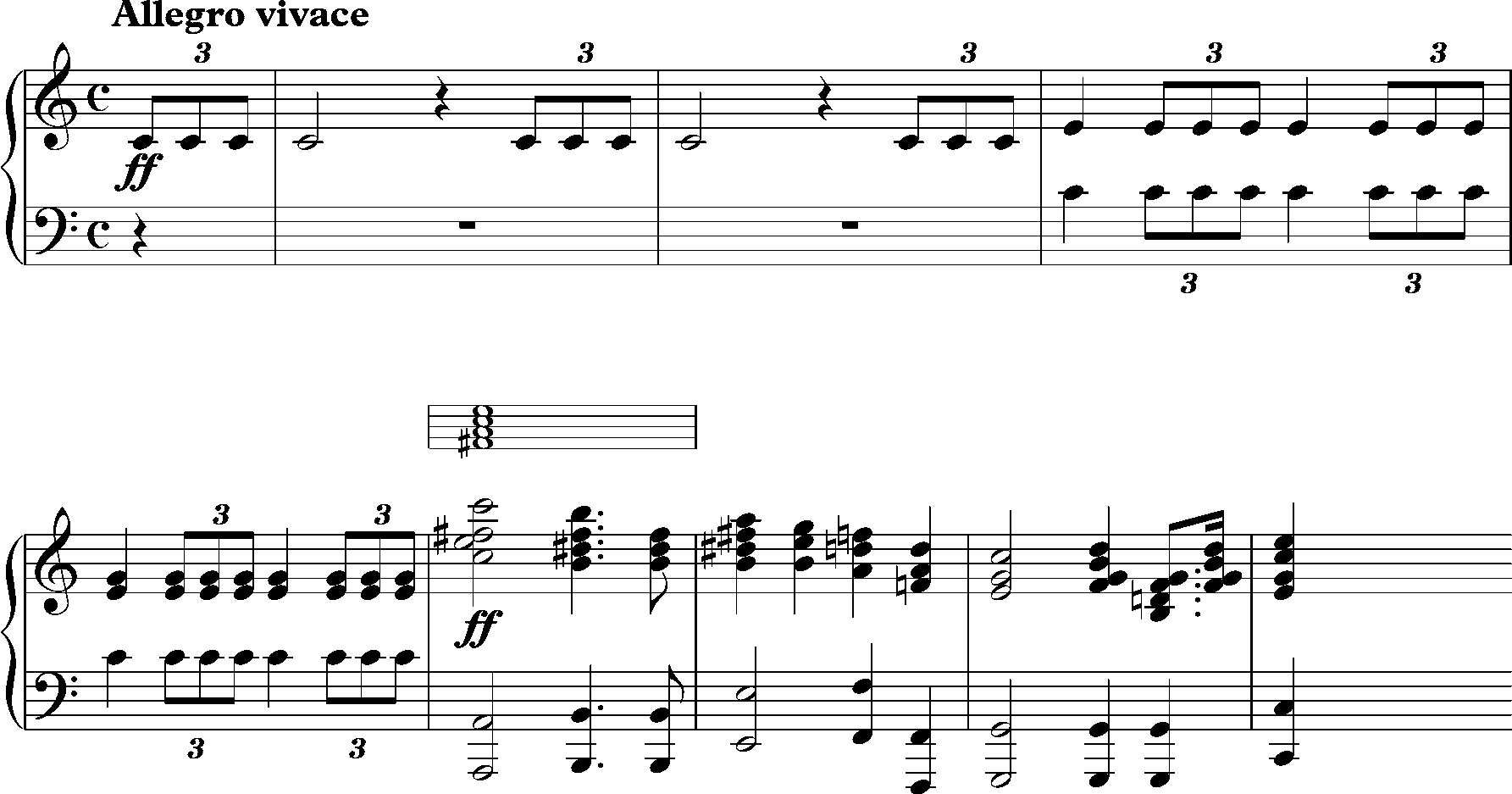
Mendelssohn, Wedding March

An instance of the power latent in this "quintessentially dramatic chord" can be found in the "shriek of despair" that launches the "torrent of fury" that is Chopin's Scherzo No. 1 (1835):

Chopin, Scherzo No. 1 bars 1–8

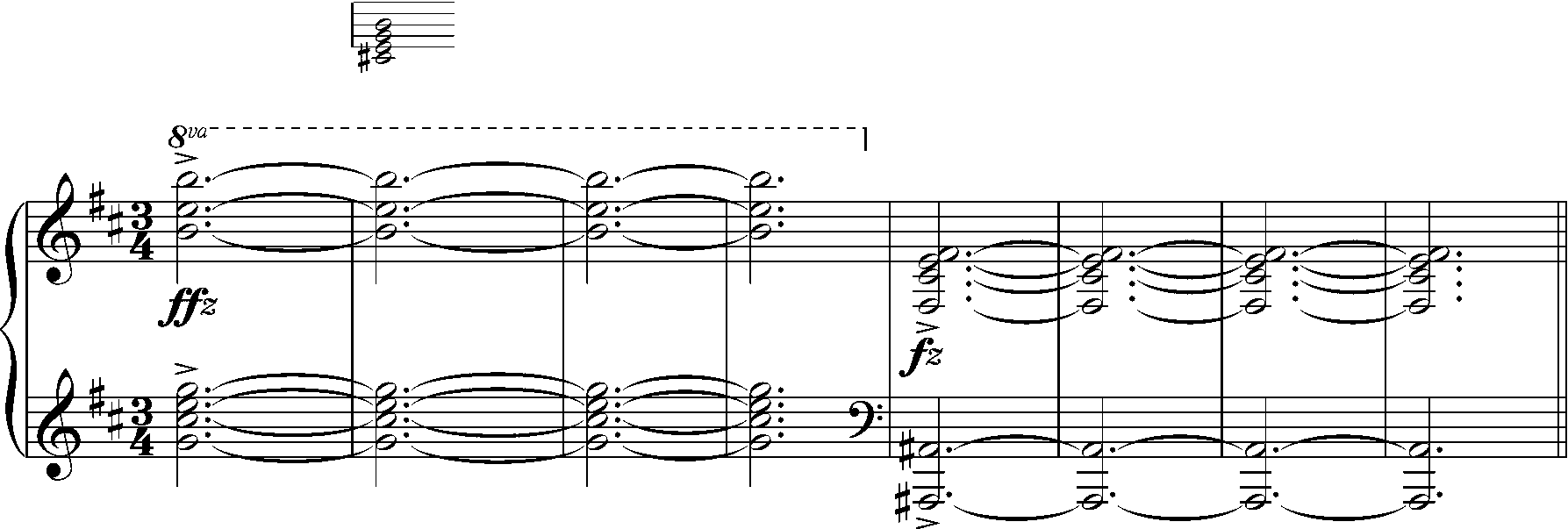
Chopin, Scherzo No. 1 bars 1–8

Wagner frequently used the chord for dramatic and expressive effect. (The chord that opens Tristan und Isolde (1859) is the best known and most-discussed example.) However, in his final opera Parsifal (1882), the composer used the half-diminished seventh to colour a leitmotif that conveys how its hero develops as the story progresses. In the first Act, the music portrays Parsifal as vigorous, youthful and naïve. His leitmotif consists almost entirely of diatonic chords:

Wagner, from Parsifal, act 1

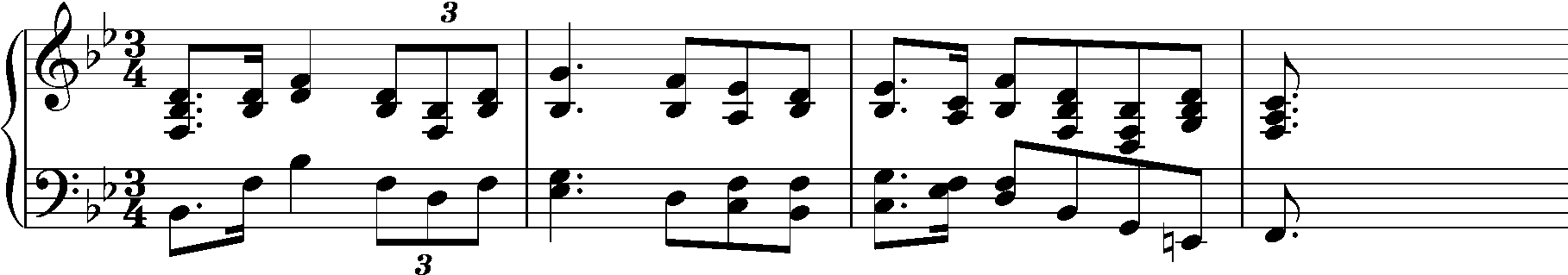
Wagner, from Parsifal, act 1

"As the hero grows in wisdom, so his music develops." When Parsifal re-appears in the final act, set many years later, half-diminished chords permeate the leitmotif. The chromatic harmony here conveys "a deeply sad and resigned impression"

Wagner, from Parsifal act 3

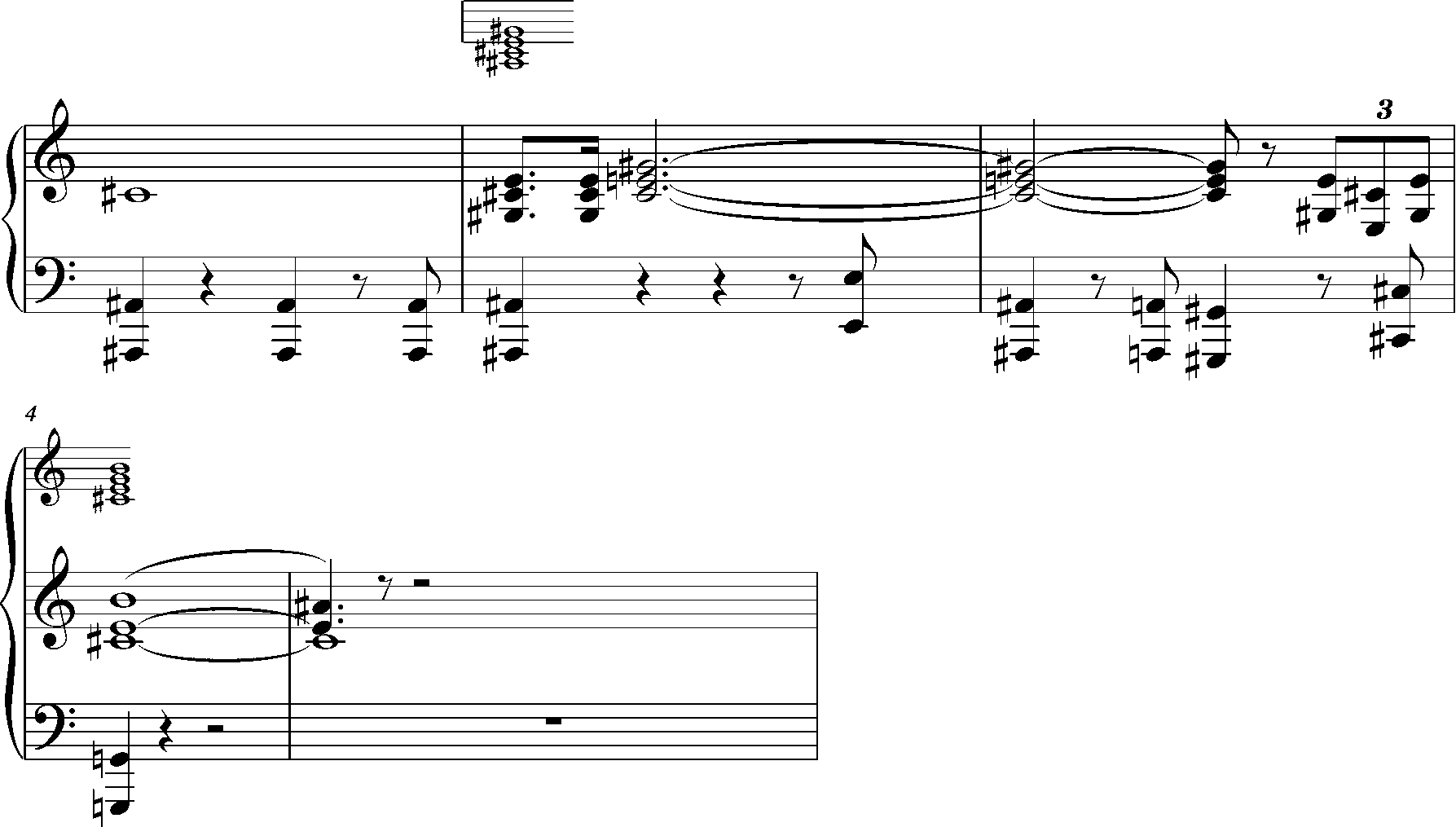
Wagner, from Parsifal act 3

In the opening section of his Fantasy-Overture, Romeo and Juliet (1880), Tchaikovsky follows a minor chord with a half-diminished chord to striking effect:

Tchaikovsky Romeo & Juliet bars 28-33

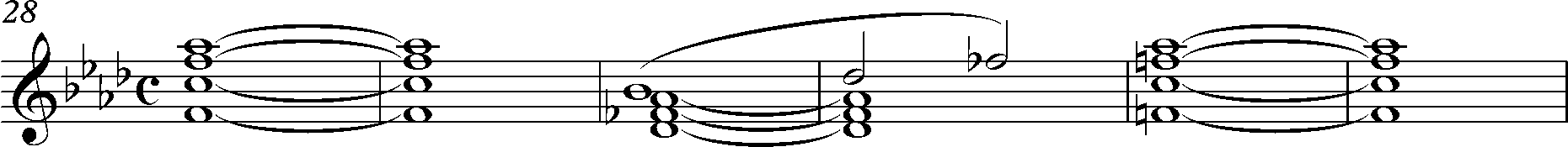
Tchaikovsky Romeo & Juliet bars 28-33

Gustav Mahler saw the opening movement of his Symphony No. 7 " (1905) as a tragic night without stars or moonlight." The low register of the half-diminished chord at the start appropriately conveys a dark, brooding character. A striking phrase on the tenor horn unfolds the chord as an arpeggio in the second bar.

Mahler, Symphony No. 7, opening

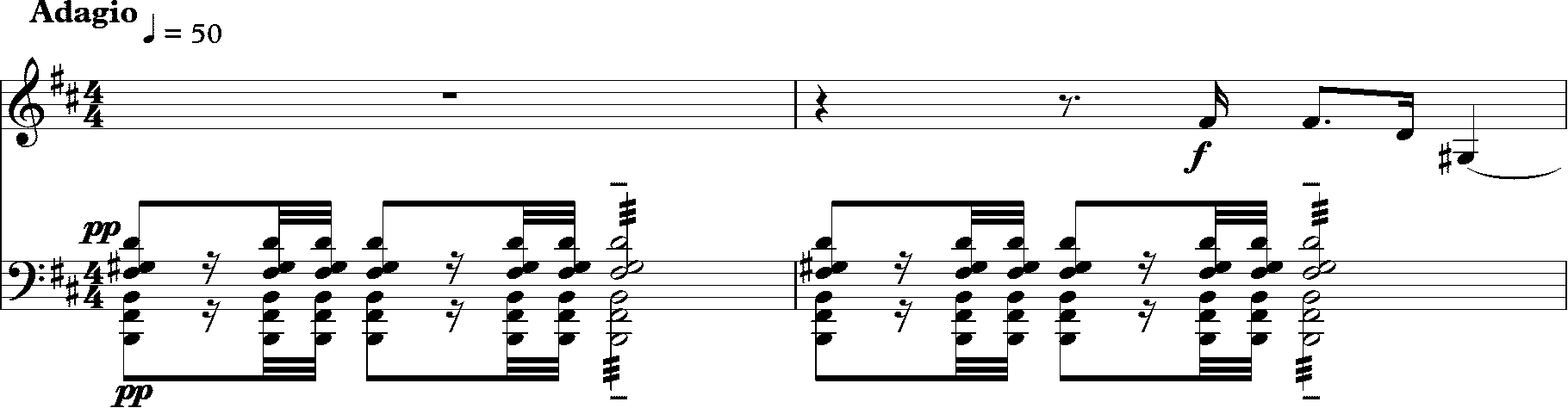
Mahler, Symphony No. 7, opening

In his book celebrating popular songs of the first half of the twentieth century, musicologist Allen Forte writes, "The half-diminished seventh chord is in many respects the star of the seventh chord harmonic cast. Many songs in the classic American popular song repertoire reserve it for their most intensely expressive moments." Forte cites as a particular example George Gershwin's use of the chord in his song "Embraceable You". Other examples in the popular song repertoire that use the half-diminished seventh chord include "From This Moment On" by Cole Porter, where the opening phrase of the melody unfolds the chord as an arpeggio and "Because" by the Beatles.

== Chord symbols and terminology ==
Half-diminished seventh chords are often symbolized as a circle with a diagonal line through it, as in B^{ø}^{7} or simply B^{ø}. It also can be represented as a minor seventh chord with a superscript "^{♭5}" (sometimes enclosed in parentheses).

The terms and symbols for this chord break expectations that derive from the usual system of chord nomenclature. Normally a symbol like "Bdim" indicates a diminished triad and "B^{7}" indicates a major triad plus a minor seventh. Thus, one would expect the term "Bdim^{7}" to indicate a diminished triad plus a minor seventh. Instead, it means a diminished triad plus a diminished seventh. To make this distinction clear, the term "half-diminished" and the ^{ø} symbol (ø) were invented. Since the term dim^{7} (as in Bdim^{7}) meant something else, the accurate but unwieldy term "minor seventh flat five" (as in B^{ø}^{7}) came to be used.

Despite the appearance of the word "diminished" in the name of this type of seventh chord, its sound differs considerably from that of a diminished seventh chord. In fact, the only sonic connection between the two chords is the single diminished triad found in the half-diminished seventh chord. As composer-theorist Milton Babbitt has astutely pointed out, the "half-diminished" seventh chord should be called the "one-third" diminished seventh chord.

Jazz musicians typically consider the half-diminished chord (more commonly known as the minor seventh flat five chord, m7♭5) as built from one of the following scales:

- the seventh mode (the Locrian mode) of the major scale;
- the sixth mode of the melodic minor scale—this scale is nearly identical to the Locrian mode, except that it has a ♮2 rather than a ♭2, giving it a somewhat more consonant quality; or
- the second mode of the harmonic minor scale.

Jazz pianist Barry Harris explained that bebop musicians would play a descending dominant seventh (Mixolydian) scale with an added half-step to keep all the chord tones on the beat. For example, for the chords "Dm7♭5 G7♭9, play down the B♭7 scale from its seventh to B" (B being the added half-step "bebop note" and third of the G7♭9 chord). This works because the notes of the Dm7♭5 chord { D F A♭ C } are also chord tones of B♭9 { B♭ D F A♭ C }. This scale, sometimes called the Phrygian dominant, is the only scale that keeps all the chord tones on the beat across the ii–V sequence.

The "Tristan chord" is sometimes described as a half-diminished seventh chord; however, the term "Tristan chord" is typically reserved for a very specific harmonic function, especially determined by the chord voicing and sometimes even the way the chord is spelled.

== Function ==
=== Most common functions ===
The half-diminished seventh chord has three functions in contemporary harmony: predominant (also called "subdominant"), diminished, and dominant function.

The vast majority of its occurrences are on the II chord in the minor mode, where it takes a predominant function, leading naturally to the dominant V chord. Not including the root motion, there is only a one-note difference between a half-diminished seventh chord and a V^{7} chord with a flat ninth. Since it is built on the diatonic II chord of the minor scale, most of the time the II-V pattern resolves to a minor tonic (such as in the progression D^{ø}^{7} – G^{7♭9} – Cm), but there are also instances where there is a major tonic resolution.

The first three measures of the Ciaccona movement of J. S. Bach's Violin Partita No. 2 in D minor

For example, over the first three bars of the Ciaccona movement of J.S. Bach's Violin Partita No. 2 in D minor, the tonic in the first measure progresses to the ii^{ø}^{7} chord (in third inversion) for the first beat of the second measure, then to the dominant (a V^{7} in first inversion), and then back to the tonic in the third measure.

Diminished chord function is rarer but still exists. Half-diminished chords can function in the same way as fully diminished chords, such as in the chord progression CM^{7} – C♯dim^{7} – Dm^{7}, or Em^{7} – E♭dim^{7} – Dm^{7}, where the diminished chord serves as a chromatic passing chord preceding a chord with a diatonic root. A typical example of this is when ♯IV^{ø}^{7} progresses to IVm^{7}, such as in the Cole Porter song "Night and Day", where there is the progression F♯^{ø}^{7} – Fm^{7} – Em^{7} – E♭dim^{7} – Dm^{7} – G^{7} – CM^{7}. If analyzed in its predominant function, it wouldn't sufficiently explain how it functions preceding the Fm^{7} chord.

In dominant function, the VII half diminished chord, like its fully diminished counterpart, can take the place of the dominant V chord at a point of cadential motion. This chord, sometimes called a leading-tone diminished seventh chord, is represented by the Roman numeral notation vii^{ø}^{7}, the root of which is the leading-tone to the tonic. In the key of C, this is chord is B^{ø}^{7}, as shown below.

This generally occurs in a major key, since the flattening of the sixth degree in the natural minor scale renders a dominant diminished seventh chord fully diminished if played within the scale. Indeed, the VII half diminished chord in a major key is identical to a dominant ninth chord (a dominant seventh with a major ninth) with its root omitted.

Secondary leading-tone half-diminished chord in Brahms's Intermezzo, Op. 119, no. 3 (1893)

The dominant function of the half-diminished seventh chord may also occur in a secondary dominant context, i.e., as part of a progression where the chord performs the dominant function with respect to the overall key's dominant chord. In this scenario, the half-diminished seventh chord is built on the tritone of the overall key and is equivalent to a secondary dominant seventh chord with added ninth and omitted root. If written with respect to the overall key, this chord is styled "♯iv^{ø}^{7}," but in terms of its function in the progression, the styling "vii^{ø7}/V" is more descriptive.

=== Other functions ===
A variant of the supertonic seventh chord (ii^{ø}^{7}) is the supertonic half-diminished seventh with the raised supertonic (♯ii^{ø}^{7}), which is enharmonically equivalent to the lowered third (in C: D♯ = E♭).

D♯–F♯–A–C♯ = F♯–A–C♯–E♭
D♯^{ø}^{7} = F♯m^{add dim7}

The sharpened subdominant diminished triad with minor seventh chord is represented with the Roman numeral notation ♯iv^{ø}^{7}; the root of this chord is the raised subdominant (sharpened fourth). That root also serves as the leading tone to the dominant when used in the vii^{ø}^{7}/V function described above; such a function is the diminished, secondary-dominant equivalent of a backdoor progression. For example, in the key of C major, the chord playing this role is F♯^{ø}^{7}.

The half-diminished seventh chord may also be enharmonically interpreted as an augmented sixth chord. The minor seventh interval (between root and seventh degree, i.e.: { C B♭ } in { C E♭ G♭ B♭ } ) is enharmonically equivalent to an augmented sixth { C E♭ G♭ A♯ }. Transposing this gives { A♭ C♭ D F♯ }, a virtual minor version of the French augmented sixth chord. Like the typical augmented sixth chord, this enharmonic interpretation gives on a resolution irregular for the half-diminished seventh but regular for the augmented sixth chord, where the two voices at the diminished third (enharmonic major second) converge to unison or diverge to octave.

== Half-diminished seventh chord table ==
Chord	Root	Minor third	Diminished fifth	Flat seventh (sharp sixth)
C♭m^{7♭5}	C♭	E (D)	G (F)	B (A)
Cm^{7♭5}	C	E♭	G♭	B♭ (A♯)
C♯m^{7♭5}	C♯	E	G	B (A)
D♭m^{7♭5}	D♭	F♭ (E)	A (G)	C♭ (B)
Dm^{7♭5}	D	F	A♭	C (B♯)
D♯m^{7♭5}	D♯	F♯	A	C♯ (B)
Dm^{7♭5}	D	F	A♯	C (B)
E♭m^{7♭5}	E♭	G♭	B (A)	D♭(C♯)
Em^{7♭5}	E	G	B♭	D (C)
E♯m^{7♭5}	E♯	G♯	B	D♯ (C)
F♭m^{7♭5}	F♭	A (G)	C (B♭)	E (D)
Fm^{7♭5}	F	A♭	C♭ (B)	E♭(D♯)
F♯m^{7♭5}	F♯	A	C	E (D)
Fm^{7♭5}	F	A♯	C♯	E♯ (D)
G♭m^{7♭5}	G♭	B (A)	D (C)	F♭ (E)
Gm^{7♭5}	G	B♭	D♭	F (E♯)
G♯m^{7♭5}	G♯	B	D	F♯ (E)
A♭m^{7♭5}	A♭	C♭ (B)	E (D)	G♭(F♯)
Am^{7♭5}	A	C	E♭	G (F)
A♯m^{7♭5}	A♯	C♯	E	G♯ (F)
B♭m^{7♭5}	B♭	D♭	F♭ (E)	A♭(G♯)
Bm^{7♭5}	B	D	F	A (G)
B♯m^{7♭5}	B♯	D♯	F♯	A♯ (G)

== See also ==
- Bar-line shift
- Diminished seventh chord
- Subtonic
- Tristan chord
- Harmony
- Tritone
