= Inversions higher than third =

Relative chord placements

In music theory, inversions higher than the third require extended chords; the fourth inversion requires at least a ninth chord, the fifth at least an eleventh chord, etc. Regarding these extensions, the writer Michael Miller notes that:

If you're working with extended chords, there are more than two possible inversions. For example, the third inversion of a seventh chord puts the seventh in the bass; the fourth inversion of a ninth chord puts the ninth in the bass...

== Fourth inversion ==
The fourth inversion of a ninth chord is the voicing in which the ninth of the chord is the bass note and the root a minor seventh (or corresponding compound interval) above it. In the fourth inversion of a G dominant ninth, the bass note is A—the ninth of the chord—with the root, third, fifth, and seventh above it, forming the intervals of a seventh, second, fourth, and sixth (or corresponding compound intervals) above A, respectively.

The chord of the ninth, having four intervals like the flat seventh, of course admits of four inversions in both major and minor... The...fourth inversion, ["marked"]: 642...is seldom used.

— John Smith (1853)

If...the Ninth is in the bass: 4th inversion of a Ninth-chord.

The ninth chord and its inversions exist today, or at least they can exist. The pupil will easily find examples in the literature [such as Schoenberg's Verklärte Nacht and Strauss's opera Salome]. It is not necessary to set up special laws for its treatment. If one wants to be careful, one will be able to use the laws that pertain to the seventh chords: that is, dissonances resolve by step downward, the root leaps a fourth upward.

— Arnold Schoenberg (1948)

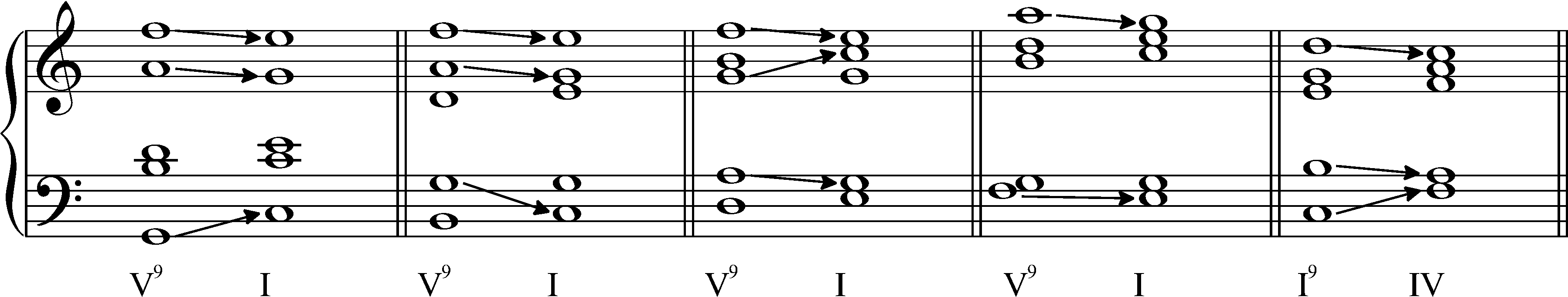
Examples of resolutions according to the rules for 7th chords given by Schoenberg: V9 chords in root position, 1st, 2nd, and 3rd inversion resolving to I, followed by a I^{9}_{♯7} resolving to IV

== Fifth inversion ==
The fifth inversion of an eleventh chord is the voicing in which the eleventh of the chord is the bass note and the root a fourth (or corresponding compound interval) above it. In the fifth inversion of a G dominant eleventh with eleventh, the bass note is C—the eleventh of the chord—with the root, third, fifth, seventh, and ninth above it, forming the intervals of a fifth, seventh, second, fourth, and sixth (or corresponding compound intervals) above C, respectively.

== Sixth inversion ==
The sixth inversion of a thirteenth chord is the highest possible diatonic inversion, since the diatonic scale has seven notes. (The "seventh" inversion of the dominant thirteenth chord is root position.) Higher inversions would require chromaticism and either nonscale tones or scales with more than seven tones.

== Arrangement of notes above the bass ==
Any voicing above the bass is allowed. For example, a fourth inversion must have the ninth chord factor in the bass, but it may have any arrangement of the root, third, fifth, and seventh above that, including doubled notes, compound intervals, and omission of the fifth (A-G-B-D-F, A-B-D-F-G-B′, A-G-D-F, etc.)

Inversions are not restricted to the same number of tones as the original chord, nor to any fixed order of tones except with regard to the interval between the root, or its octave, and the bass note, hence, great variety results.

== See also ==
- Figured bass
- Root position
- Inversion (music)
- First inversion
- Second inversion
- Third inversion
