= Piano Sonata No. 18 (Beethoven) =

Piano sonata written by Beethoven

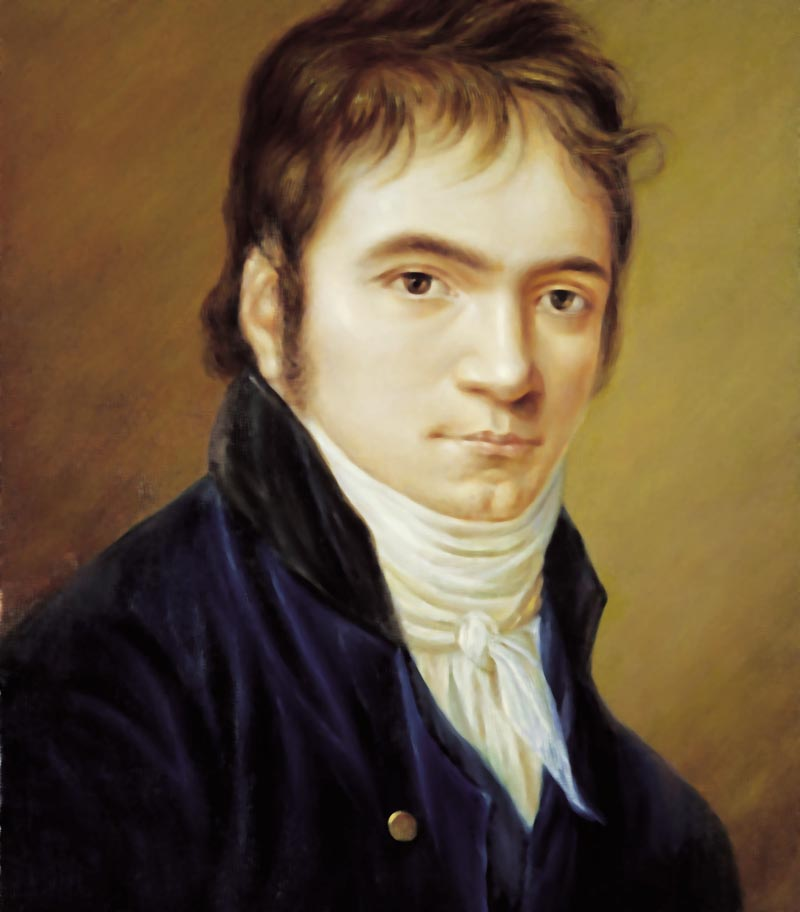
Ludwig van Beethoven in 1803

The Piano Sonata No. 18 in E♭ major, Op. 31, No. 3, is an 1802 sonata for solo piano by Ludwig van Beethoven. A third party gave the piece the nickname "The Hunt" due to one of its themes' resemblance to a horn call. Beethoven maintains a playful jocularity throughout much of the piece, but as in many of his early works, the jocular style can be heard as a facade, concealing profound ideas and depths of emotion.

Roger Kamien has performed a Schenkerian analysis of facets of chords of the sonata.

== Analysis ==
I. Allegro

II. Scherzo

III. Menuetto

IV. Presto con fuoco
Played by Artur Schnabel in 1932

The sonata consists of four movements and takes approximately twenty-two minutes to perform:

1. Allegro
2. Scherzo. Allegretto vivace
3. Menuetto. Moderato e grazioso
4. Presto con fuoco

The sonata is unusual in lacking a slow movement.

=== I. Allegro ===
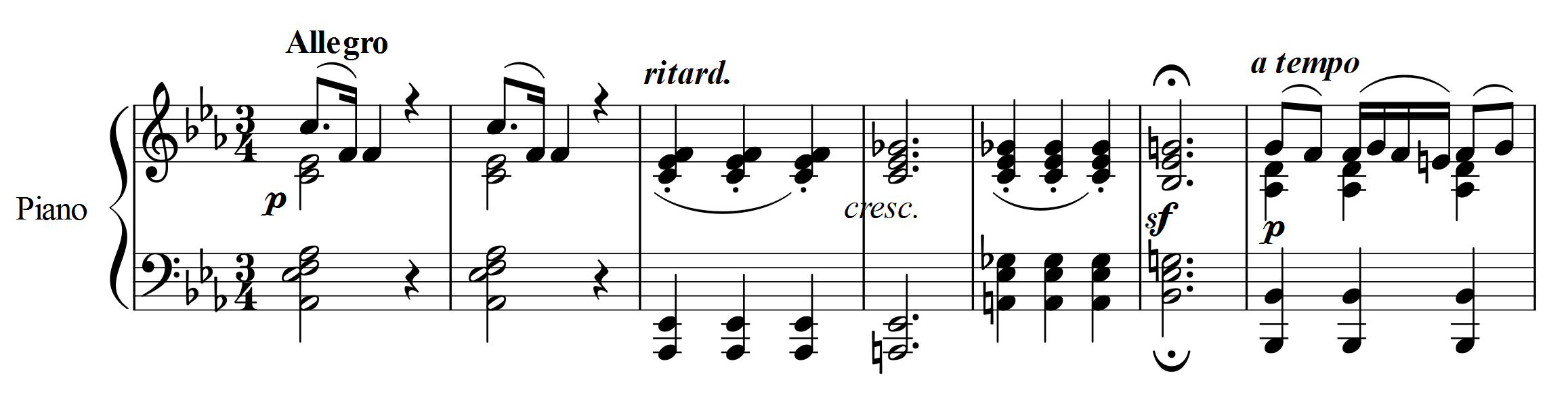

Beethoven's progressive harmonic language is apparent from the very first chord of the piece (third inversion of the eleventh on dominant B♭); the stability of a tonic chord in root position is delayed until bar 8. The expressive harmonic colour coupled with the changes of tempi in the introduction (mm. 1–18) create an evocative opening, reminiscent of the improvisatory style of C. P. E. Bach's piano sonatas. This opening cell is repeated extensively throughout the movement – at the start of the development (m. 89), in the recapitulation (m. 137), and during the coda (transposed into the subdominant A♭ (m. 220), and then at its original pitch (m. 237)). The modulatory passage between the first and second subjects (mm. 33–45) explores the opening chord, but in a minor variation (with a C♭, implying ii^{7} of E♭ minor), even appearing in bar 36 in the exact spacing (albeit with different spelling) of the Tristan chord written by Richard Wagner some 55 years later.

=== II. Scherzo ===
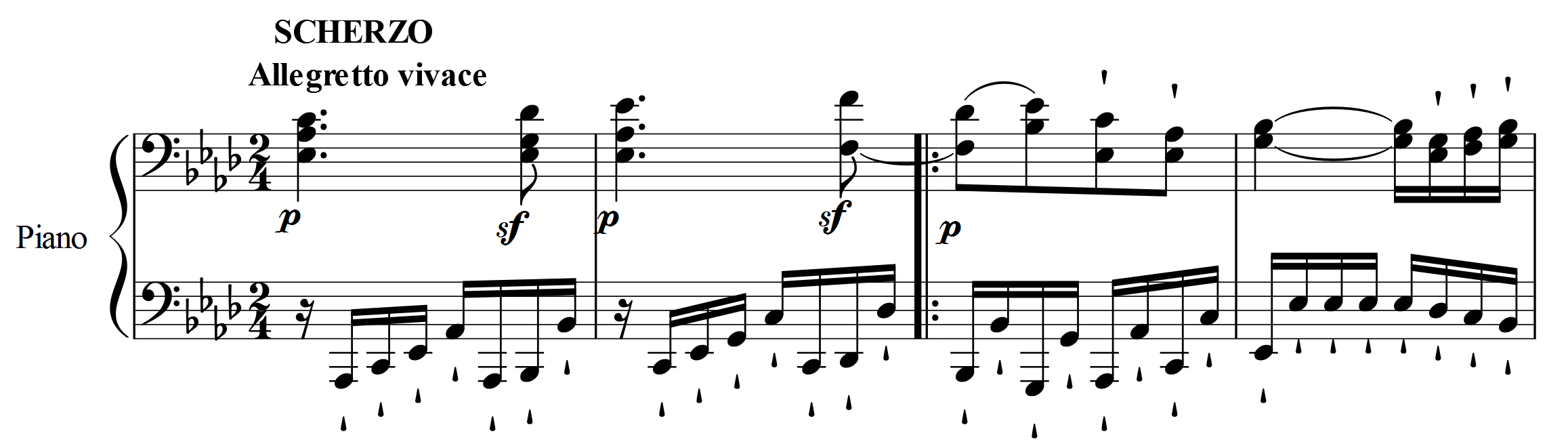

This scherzo differs from normal scherzos by being in 2/4 time rather than 3/4, and because it is in sonata form rather than ternary form. This wasn't the first time Beethoven wrote a scherzo not in ternary form; Op. 14, No. 2 has a scherzo in rondo form as its finale. But this movement still contains many characteristics of a scherzo, including unexpected pauses and a playful nature. The theme is in the right hand while the left hand contains staccato accompaniment.

=== III. Menuetto ===
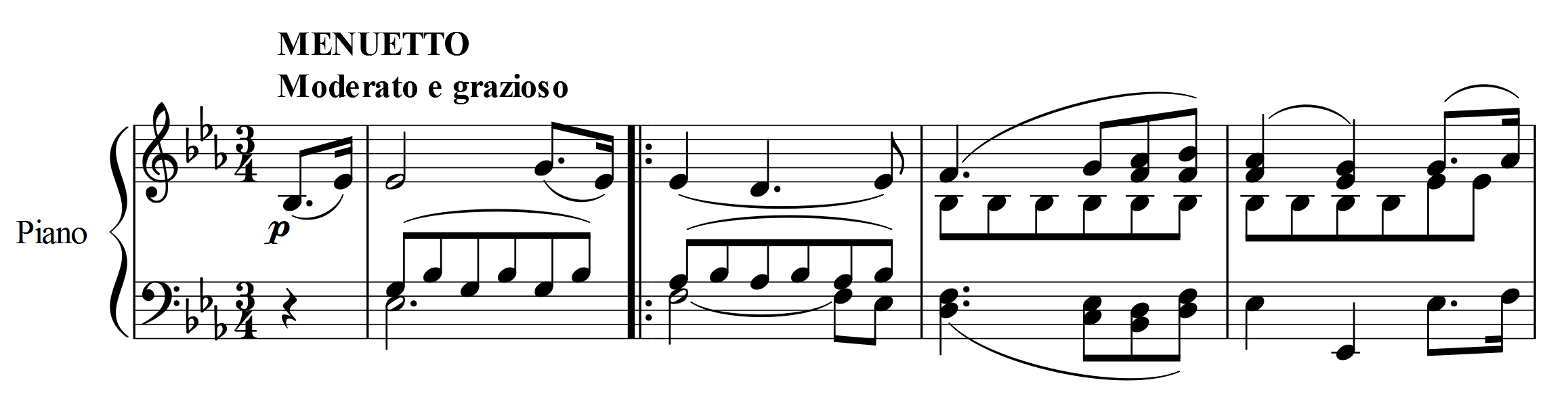

The third movement is the most serious of the movements, with a sweet and tender nature. The minuet and the trio are in E♭ major.

=== IV. Presto con fuoco ===
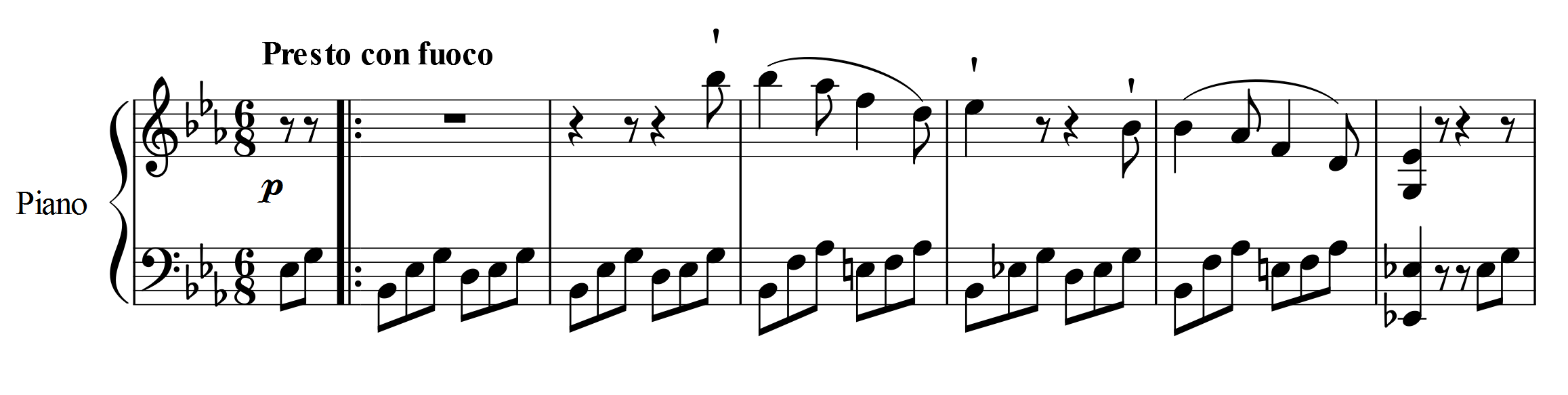

The finale is vigorous and rollicking, with continuous eighth notes in the bass and tarantella rhythms.

== Adaptations ==
- Camille Saint-Saëns used the Trio section of the Menuetto as the theme for his 1874 Variations sur un thème de Beethoven, Op. 35, for two pianos.
