= Diminished triad =

Type of musical chord

diminished triad
Component intervals from root
- diminished fifth (tritone)
- minor third
- root

Tuning
- 45:54:64; 54:45=6:5 & 64:45

Forte no. / Complement
- 3-10 / 9-10

In music theory, a diminished triad is a triad with a minor third and a diminished fifth above the root. When using chord symbols, it may be indicated by the symbols "dim", "^{o}", "m^{♭5}", or "MI^{(♭5)}". However, in most popular-music chord books, the symbol "dim" or "^{o}" represents a diminished seventh chord (a four-tone chord), which in some modern jazz books and music theory books is represented by the "dim7" or "^{o}^{7}" symbols.

For example, the diminished triad built on B, written as B^{o}, has pitches B-D-F:

The chord can be represented by the integer notation {0, 3, 6}.

In the common practice period, the diminished triad was considered dissonant because of the diminished fifth (or tritone).

== Harmonic function ==
A diminished triad substituting for dominant chord in J. S. Bach's Well-Tempered Clavier I, Prelude in G major.

In major scales, a diminished triad occurs only on the seventh scale degree. For instance, in the key of C, this is a B diminished triad (B, D, F). Since the triad is built on the seventh scale degree, it is also called the leading-tone triad. This chord has a dominant function. Unlike the dominant triad or dominant seventh, the leading-tone triad functions as a prolongational chord rather than a structural chord since the strong root motion by fifth is absent.

On the other hand, in natural minor scales, the diminished triad occurs on the second scale degree; in the key of C minor, this is the D diminished triad (D, F, A♭). This triad is consequently called the supertonic diminished triad. Like the supertonic minor triad found in a major key, the supertonic diminished triad has a predominant function, almost always resolving to a dominant functioning chord.

If the music is in a minor key, diminished triads can also be found on the raised seventh note, ♯vii^{o}. This is because the ascending melodic minor scale has a raised sixth and seventh degree. For example, the chord progression ♯vii^{o}–i is common.

The leading-tone diminished triad and supertonic diminished triad are usually found in first inversion (vii^{o}^{6} and ii^{o}^{6}, respectively) since the spelling of the chord forms a diminished fifth with the bass. This differs from the fully diminished seventh chord, which commonly occurs in root position. In both cases, the bass resolves up and the upper voices move downwards in contrary motion.

== In popular music ==
Walter Everett writes that "In rock and pop music, the diminished triad nearly always appears on the second scale degree, forming a generally maudlin and dejected ii^{o} with its members, 2–4–♭6." Songs that feature ii^{o} include Santo & Johnny's "Sleep Walk", Jay and the Americans' "Cara Mia", and the Hollies' "The Air That I Breathe". Ken Stephenson writes that "diminished triads and seventh chords are rare in rock" but not entirely absent; diminished chords are present in Oasis' "Don't Look Back in Anger", David Bowie's "Space Oddity", and Daryl Hall's "Everytime You Go Away".

The vii^{o} in major keys is relatively less common than the ii^{o}, but still does happen. It is almost always used to tonicize the relative minor, in progressions such as vii^{o}–V^{7}/vi–vi, which resembles ii^{o}–V^{7}–i in the relative minor.

== Tuning ==
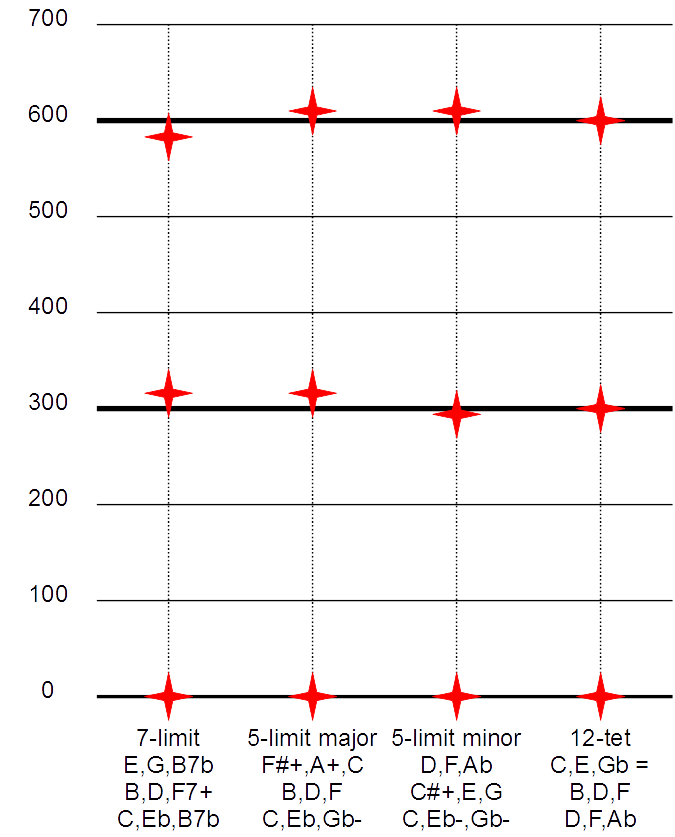
Comparison, in cents, of diminished triad tunings

In a twelve-tone equal temperament, a diminished triad has three semitones between the third and fifth, three semitones between the root and third, and six semitones between the root and fifth.

In 5-limit just intonation, the diminished chord on VII (in C: B–D–F) is 15:8, 9:8, and 4:3, while on II (in C: D–F–A♭) it is 9:8, 4:3, and 8:5 (135:160:192). According to Georg Andreas Sorge, the trumpet, in its overtone series on C, gives the diminished triad E–G–B♭ = 5:6:7 ("perfect diminished chord"), but the 7 is too flat and 45:54:64 is preferred. Helmholtz describes the diminished triad as _{1} − D | F, giving a just minor third and Pythagorean minor third (45:54:64) in the notation system used in On the Sensations of Tone as a Physiological Basis for the Theory of Music.

Play Perfect, Preferred (5-limit major), or 5-limit minor on C.

	Sorge (perfect)/ 7-limit			Sorge (preferred)/ 5-limit major			5-limit minor (D,F,A♭)		
Harmonics
Root	E	5	386.31	F♯+	45	590.22	C♯	135	92.18
Third	G	6	701.96	A+	54	905.87	E	160	386.31
Fifth	B♭	7	968.83	C	64	1200	G	192	701.96
On B
Root	B	15:8	1088.27	B	15:8	1088.27	B	15:8	1088.27
Third	D	9:8	203.91	D	9:8	203.91	D-	10:9	182.40
Fifth	F+	21:16	470.78	F	4:3	498.04	F	4:3	498.04
On C
Root	C	1:1	0	C	1:1	0	C	1:1	0
Third	E♭	6:5	315.64	E♭	6:5	315.64	E♭-	32:27	294.13
Fifth	G♭	7:5	582.51	G♭-	64:45	609.78	G♭-	64:45	609.78

== Diminished chord table ==
Chord	Root	Minor third	Diminished fifth
Cdim	C	E♭	G♭
C♯dim	C♯	E	G
D♭dim	D♭	F♭ (E)	A (G)
Ddim	D	F	A♭
D♯dim	D♯	F♯	A
E♭dim	E♭	G♭	B (A)
Edim	E	G	B♭
Fdim	F	A♭	C♭ (B)
F♯dim	F♯	A	C
G♭dim	G♭	B (A)	D (C)
Gdim	G	B♭	D♭
G♯dim	G♯	B	D
A♭dim	A♭	C♭ (B)	E (D)
Adim	A	C	E♭
A♯dim	A♯	C♯	E
B♭dim	B♭	D♭	F♭ (E)
Bdim	B	D	F

== See also ==
- Half-diminished seventh chord
- Secondary leading-tone chord
- Augmented triad
- Diminished seventh chord
