= Third inversion =

Relative chord placement

The third inversion of a seventh chord is the voicing in which the seventh of the chord is the bass note. In the third inversion of a G dominant seventh chord, the bass note is F—the seventh of the chord—with the root, third, and fifth above it, forming the intervals of a second, fourth, and sixth (or corresponding compound intervals) above F, respectively. In figured bass, it is referred to as a ^{4}_{2} chord.

According to The American History and Encyclopedia of Music:

Inversions are not restricted to the same number of tones as the original chord, nor to any fixed order of tones except with regard to the interval between the root, or its octave, and the bass note, hence, great variety results.

Note that any voicing above the bass is allowed. A third inversion chord must have the seventh chord factor in the bass, but it may have any arrangement of the root, third, and fifth above that, including doubled notes, compound intervals, and omission (F–G–B–D, F–B–D–G', F–G–B–D–G', etc.)

== See also ==
- Figured bass
- Root position
- Inversion (music)
- First inversion
- Second inversion
- Fourth inversion
