= Second inversion =

Relative chord placement

A G-major triad in second inversion

The second inversion of a chord is the voicing of a triad or seventh chord in which the fifth of the chord is the bass note. In this inversion, the bass note and the root of the chord are a fourth apart (or a corresponding compound interval) which traditionally qualifies as a dissonance. There is therefore a tendency for movement and resolution. In notation form, it may be referred to with a c following the chord position (e.g., Ic. Vc or IVc). In figured bass, a second-inversion triad is a ^{6}_{4} chord (as in I^{6}_{4}), while a second inversion seventh chord is a ^{4}_{3} chord.

Inversions are not restricted to the same number of tones as the original chord, nor to any fixed order of tones except with regard to the interval between the root, or its octave, and the bass note, hence, great variety results.

Note that any voicing above the bass is allowed. A second inversion chord must have the fifth chord factor in the bass, but it may have any arrangement of the root and third above that, including doubled notes, compound intervals, and omission (G–C–E, G–C–E–G', G–E–G–C'–E', etc.)

== Examples ==
In the second inversion of a C major triad, the bass note is G—the fifth of the triad—with the root and third above it, forming the intervals of a fourth and sixth (or corresponding compound intervals) above G, respectively.

In the second inversion of a G dominant seventh chord, the bass note is D, the fifth of the seventh chord.

== Types ==
There are four types of second-inversion chords: cadential, passing, auxiliary, and bass arpeggiation.

=== Cadential ===
Cadential second-inversion chords are typically used in the authentic cadence I^{6}_{4}-V-I, or one of its variation, like I^{6}_{4}-V^{7}-I. In this form, the chord is sometimes referred to as a cadential ^{6}_{4} chord. The chord preceding I^{6}_{4} is most often a chord that would introduce V as a weak to strong progression, for example, making -II-V into II-I^{6}_{4}-V or making IV-V into IV-I^{6}_{4}-V.

The cadential ^{6}_{4} can be analyzed in two ways: the first labels it as a second-inversion chord, while the second treats it instead as part of a horizontal progression involving voice leading above a stationary bass.

1. In the first designation, the cadential ^{6}_{4} chord features the progression: I^{6}_{4}-V-I. Most older harmony textbooks use this label, and it can be traced back to the early 19th century.
2. In the second designation, this chord is not considered an inversion of a tonic triad but as a dissonance resolving to a consonant dominant harmony. This is notated as V^{6–5}_{4–3}-I, in which the ^{6}_{4} is not the inversion of the V chord but a double appoggiatura on the V that resolves down by step to V^{5}_{3} (that is, V^{6}_{4}-V). This function is very similar to the resolution of a 4–3 suspension. Several modern textbooks prefer this conception of the cadential ^{6}_{4}, which can also be traced back to the early 19th century.

=== Passing ===
In a progression with a passing second-inversion chord, the bass passes between two tones a third apart (usually of the same harmonic function). When moving from I to I^{6}, the passing chord V^{6}_{4} is placed between them – though some prefer VII^{6} to V^{6}_{4} – creating stepwise motion in the bass (scale degrees – –). It can also be used in the reverse direction: I^{6}-V^{6}_{4}-I. The important point is that the V^{6}_{4} chord functions as a passing chord between the two more stable chords. It occurs on the weaker beat between these two chords. The upper voices usually move in step (or remain stationary) in this progression.

=== Pedal (or auxiliary) ===
In a progression with an pedal (or auxiliary) second-inversion chord, the IV^{6}_{4} chord functions as the harmonization of a neighbor note in the progression, I-IV^{6}_{4}-I. In this progression, the third and fifth rise a step each and then fall back, creating a harmonization for the scale degrees – – in the top voice.

=== Bass arpeggiation ===
In this progression, the bass arpeggiates the root, third, and fifth of the chord. This is just a florid movement but since the fifth is present in the bass, it is referred to as a bass arpeggiation flavour of the second inversion.

== See also ==
- Root position
- First inversion
- Third inversion
- Fourth inversion

== Bibliography ==
- Lovelock, William. First Year Harmony (Complete ed.). London: A. Hammond & Co.
