= Third (chord) =

In a chord, the third factor is the note three scale degrees above the root (including the root itself in the count). For instance, in a C major triad, E is the third factor.

When the third is the bass note (i.e., the lowest note) of the triad or seventh chord, the chord is in first inversion.

== Use ==
Conventionally, the third is third in importance to the root and fifth, with the third in all primary triads (I, IV, V and i, iv, v) being either major or minor.

The third in both major and augmented chords is major (E♮ in C) and the third in both minor and diminished chords is minor (E♭ in C).
