= Bass note =

Lowest note of a chord

In music theory, the bass note of a chord or sonority is the lowest note played or notated. If there are multiple voices it is the note played or notated in the lowest voice (the note furthest in the bass.)

Three situations are possible:

1. The bass note is the root or fundamental of the chord. The chord is in root position.
2. One of the other pitches of the chord is in the bass. This makes it an inverted chord
3. The bass note is not one of the notes in the chord. Such a bass note is an additional note, coloring the chord above it. Such a chord is also called a slash chord.

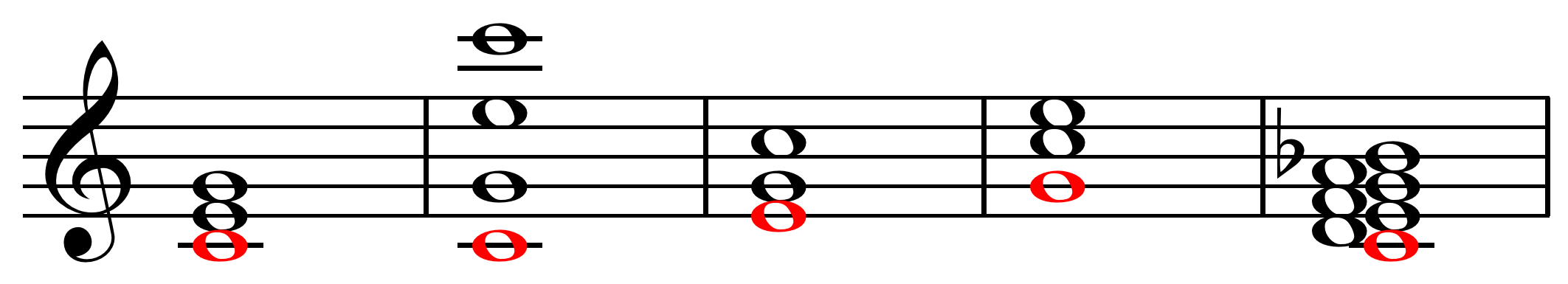
Examples with bass note in red: C major chord in root position close position (C), open position (C), first inversion (E), second inversion (G), and cluster on C (C).

In pre-tonal theory (early music), root notes were not considered and thus the bass was the most defining note of a sonority. In pandiatonic chords the bass often does not determine the chord, as is always the case with a nonharmonic bass.

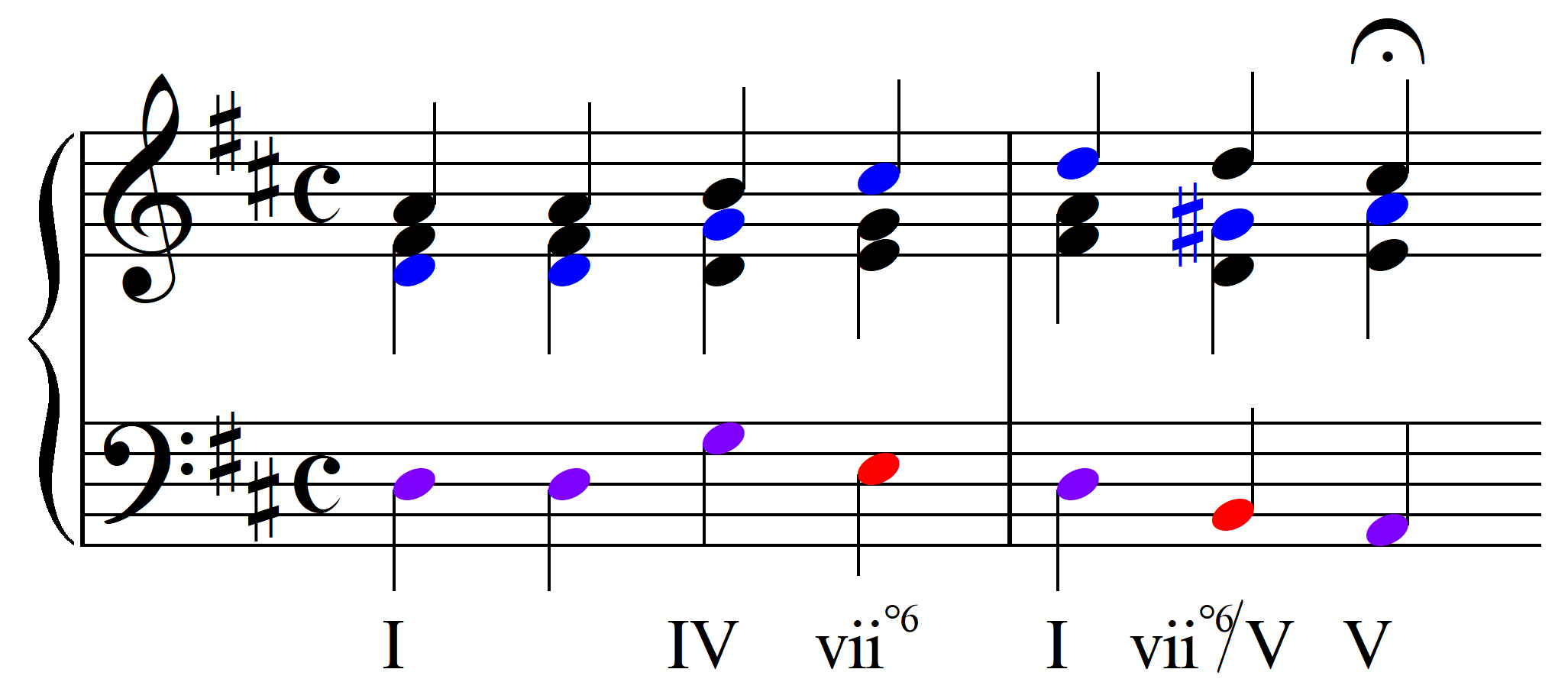
Root notes and bass notes in an 18th century Chorale (bass notes are red, roots are blue, and bass notes which are also roots are purple)
