= Root position =

Term in music

The root position of a chord is the voicing of a triad, seventh chord, or ninth chord in which the root of the chord is the bass note and the other chord factors are above it. In the root position, of a C major triad, the bass is C—the root of the triad—with the third and the fifth stacked above it, forming the intervals of a third and a fifth above the root of C, respectively.

In the root position of G dominant seventh chord, the bass note is G, the root of the seventh chord.

In figured bass, a root-position triad has no symbol, while a root-position seventh chord is notated with a "7".

According to The American History and Encyclopedia of Music:

Inversions are not restricted to the same number of tones as the original chord, nor to any fixed order of tones except with regard to the interval between the root, or its octave, and the bass note, hence, great variety results.

Note that any voicing above the bass is allowed. A root position chord must have the root chord factor in the bass, but it may have any arrangement of the third and fifth above that, including doubled notes, compound intervals, and omission (e.g., C–E–G, C–E–G–E', C–G'–E'', etc.)

== See also ==
- Figured bass
- Inversion (music)
- First inversion
- Second inversion
- Third inversion
- Fourth inversion
