= Axis system =

System of music analysis

In music, the axis system is a system of analysis originating in the work of Ernő Lendvai, which he developed in his analysis of the music of Béla Bartók.

The axis system is "concerned with harmonic and tonal substitution", and posits a novel type of functional relationship between tones and chords. Lendvai's analyses aim to show how chords and tones related by the intervals of a minor third and tritone can function as tonal substitutes for one another, and do so in many of Bartók's compositions.

== Introduction ==
In classical and common-practice systems of harmony, certain chord substitutions are recognised and are commonly made use of by composers and arrangers: "certain chords have been able to act as substitutes for others; for example, the submediant chord ... can replace the tonic, most familiarly in an interrupted cadence." In his analyses of Bartók's music, Lendvai identifies a novel set of tonal substitutions; substitutions that relate chords and keys in a flat mediant relation to one another, and also those related by the tritone, a tonal relationship "normally regarded as the most remote pitch/chord/key area from the tonic." Lendvai argued that these relationships had a naturalistic basis (that is, were not merely an analytical or compositional contrivance), and argued that many of Bartók's compositions made essential use of the tonal substitutability he described. By establishing the veracity of this novel set of relationships, Lendvai "attempts to 'explain' Bartók's chromaticism within a tonally functional model."

== Terms and definitions ==
In his analysis, Lendvai groups the twelve tones of the chromatic scale into three sets; each set of tones contains those notes that are found at intervals of a minor third and tritone from one another (equivalent to the notes that make up the three possible diminished seventh chords). Thus, there are four notes in each of the three sets, sets which Lendvai refers to as "axes". By way of analogy with common practice harmony, the three axes are categorised as tonic, subdominant, and dominant.

Tones related to each other by the interval of a tritone are said to be part of a pair or branch (e.g. C/F♯, E♭/A, etc.). Thus, each of the three axes contains two branches, and are further categorised as either the 'principal' or 'secondary' branch of axes in question. Continuing with the language of axes, the members of each branch are known as "pole and counterpole". Thus, the twelve tones of the chromatic scale are identified in a two-part system of categorisation: each tone is a member of a four note axis (tonic, dominant, and subdominant); each tone is part of a branch within that axis that is either the principal or secondary branch of that axis; and each branch consists of a pole and counterpole.

If 'C' is taken as tonic, then the categorisation proceeds as follows:

Tonic		Subdominant		Dominant	
Primary	Secondary	Primary	Secondary	Primary	Secondary
C, F♯	A, D♯	F, B	D, G♯	G, C♯	E, A♯

== Substitutability ==
The essential idea behind the axis system is that the axes group together "substituable key areas", and categorises key areas within a particular axis in reference to the strength and appropriateness of their inter-substitutability. Counterpoles that form one branch of an axis are more closely related than the counterpoles of the other branch of that axis: inter-substitutability within a branch is a stronger relationship than between the two branches of an axis. However, each axis possesses a "two-fold affinity", one being the relationship between pole and counterpole, the other being the relationship between the principal branch with the secondary branch. The relation between pole and counterpole, "its closest replacement" is judged to be stronger much more sensitive than the relation between the other poles of an axis, and due to this Lendvai states that "a pole is always interchangeable with its counterpole without any change in its function."

Essential to Lendvai's conception of the axis system and the relationships it describes is the idea that "the particular axes should not be considered as chords of the diminished seventh, but as the functional relationships of four different tonalities, which may best be compared to the major-minor relations of classical music (e.g. C major and A minor, E♭ major and C minor)."

== Analysis of Music for Strings, Percussion and Celesta ==
The form of the first movement of Music for Strings, Percussion and Celesta provides an illustration of axis-based substitution, where the opening is based upon the pole of the principal branch of the tonic axis (A, A-C-E♭-F♯), the middle contrasts the opening and the end of the first movement by being based on E♭. In the second movement the beginning and ending based on C are contrasted with the middle based on its pole F♯. The two movements themselves are contrasted through the first being based on the principal branch (A-E♭) and the second on the secondary (C-F♯).

Movement	Section		
	Beginning	Middle	End
I	A	E♭	A
II	C	F♯	C
III	F♯	C	F♯
IV	A	E♭	A

The pattern Tonic-Super Tonic-Subdominant relationship repeats itself counter clockwise around the circle of fifths. This pattern creates the root movement of a ii/V7/I chord progression. The tonic dominant relationship is repeated around the circle in clockwise fashion.

== Composition and analysis with the axis system ==
It may be noted that each of the above notes forms a descending diminished chord. In the case of I or C, C-A-F♯-D♯, or an E♭ fully diminished chord. This connects the axis system not only with diminished chords, which often form the basis for the movement in a piece based on the axis system, but also links the axis system with the diminished scales formed on ♭III of each of the principal tones: root, subdominant, and dominant.

The axis system is probably used more in analysis, and less in composition. Uses of the system have a characteristic sound, but that sound is similar to that which can be found in uses of tritone Dominant Substitutions, and Deceptive Cadences using the ♭VII dominant chord. Older systems of harmonic theory segue very easily into the axis system.

== The axis system and jazz ==
Brazilian music, especially the music of Antonio Carlos Jobim, uses harmonies that are easily analyzed by the axis system and not easily analyzed in other ways. A great example is the bridge of The Girl from Ipanema.

The tritone substitution, an harmonic device common in jazz chord progressions where a dominant V chord is substituted with a bII7 chord (or a secondary dominant II7 chord with a bVI7 chord, etc.), whose common justification is the enharmonicity of the tritones of both chords (G7 has a B-F tritone whereas D♭7 has an enharmonic Cb-F tritone, and both may resolve to C-E), and which is similar to the German sixth of classical harmony, corresponds to a special case of the classification of functions as established by the axis system.

The Backdoor progression is jazz terminology for the bVII chord functioning as a dominant in a major key (Such as Bb leading to C in the key of C major) and can be justified through the axis system because the bVII chord is on the dominant axis.

== See also ==
- Acoustic scale
- Coltrane changes

== Sources ==
- Wilson, Paul (1992). The Music of Béla Bartók. ISBN 0-300-05111-5.
- Lendvai, Ernő (1979) [1971]. Béla Bartók: An Analysis of his Music. introd. by Alan Bush. London: Kahn & Averill. ISBN 0-900707-04-6. OCLC 240301.
- Cooper, David "Bartok: Concerto for Orchestra", ch. 3 Genesis and Reception, CUP
