= Subtonic =

Degree of a musical scale

The scale and subtonic triad in C minor.

In music, the subtonic is the degree of a musical scale which is a whole step below the tonic note. In a major key, it is a lowered, or flattened, seventh scale degree (♭). It appears as the seventh scale degree in the natural minor and descending melodic minor scales but not in the major scale. In major keys, the subtonic sometimes appears in borrowed chords. In the movable do solfège system, the subtonic note is sung as te (or ta).

The subtonic is often confused with the leading note, which is a half step below the tonic. The distinction between the leading note and the subtonic has been made by theorists since the 1920s. Before that, the term subtonic often referred to the leading tone triad, for example.

The word subtonic is also used as an English translation of subtonium, the Latin term used in Gregorian chant theory for the similar usage of a tone one whole step below the mode final in the Dorian, Phrygian, and Mixolydian modes.

== Chord ==
"In minor, the subtonic serves as secondary dominant to the mediant (Bach BWV 26)

The triad built on the subtonic note is called the subtonic chord. In Roman numeral analysis, the subtonic chord is symbolized by the Roman numeral "♭VII" in a major key. In a minor key, it is often written as "VII", the flat symbol being often omitted by some theorists because the subtonic note appears in the natural minor scale. The flat symbol is used for the major scale because the subtonic is a non-diatonic note.

Theorists Stefan Kostka and Dorothy Payne describe the subtonic chord (VII) as "sounding like the V in the key of the relative major—that is, a V of ♭III." Allen Forte writes that "[w]hile VII in relation to C minor (I) becomes V in relation to III (E♭ major).... As a major triad on an unaltered or natural scale degree 7 in minor the VII functions as a secondary dominant triad in relation to the mediant." In the minor mode, the subtonic chord may also appear as a major minor seventh chord (i.e. dominant seventh chord), ♭VII^{7}.

A backdoor progression in C: ii–♭VII^{7}–I

In jazz, the flattened seventh is also used as a substitute for the dominant, V, especially in the backdoor cadence, ii–♭VII^{7}–I, where the subtonic is substituted for the dominant seventh. In this case, ♭VII functions as a pivot chord borrowed from the parallel minor (its dominant seventh). The chords V^{7} and ♭VII^{7} have two common tones: in C major, these chords are G–B–D–F and B♭–D–F–A♭.

However, while "the leading-tone/tonic relationship is axiomatic to the definition of common practice tonality", especially cadences and modulations, in popular music and rock a diatonic scalic leading tone (i.e., ♮–) is often absent. In popular music, rather than "departures" or "aberrant", the "use of the 'flattened' diatonic seventh scale degree… should not even be viewed as departures". In reference to chords built on the flattened seventh, Richard Franko Goldman argues that "the concept of borrowing is in actuality unnecessary. The mixture of major and minor is a simple fact in the Classical and Romantic periods."

== See also ==
- ♭VII–V^{7} cadence
- Leading note

== Notes ==
Sources

- Moore, Allan F. (1995). "The So-called 'Flattened Seventh' in Rock". Popular Music. 14 (2): 185–201. doi:10.1017/S0261143000007431. S2CID 162661553.
