= Montgomery-Ward bridge =

Chord progression used in jazz standards

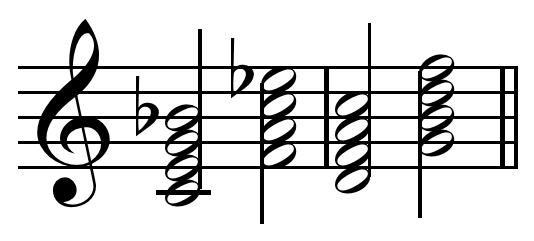
Montgomery-Ward bridge in C

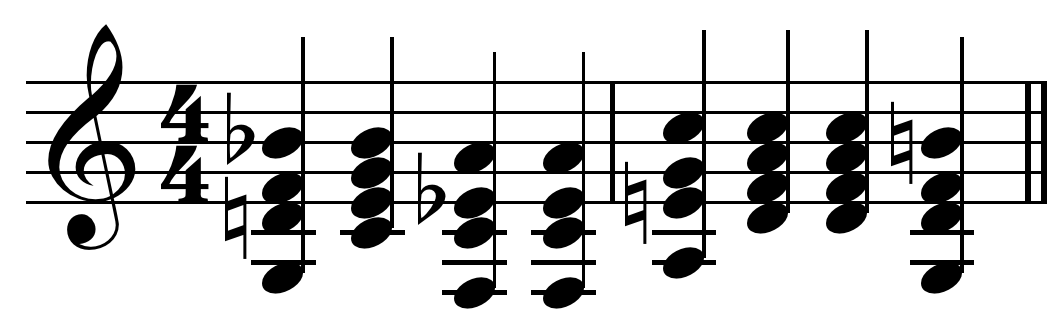
Montgomery-Ward bridge with ii–Vs in C

In jazz music, the Montgomery-Ward bridge (also Riepel's Monte) is a standard chord progression often used as the bridge, or 'B section', of a jazz standard. The progression consists, in its most basic form, of the chords I^{7}–IV^{7}–ii^{7}–V^{7}. Often, some or all of the dominants are substituted with ii–V progressions or otherwise altered. This is used in such standards as "The Sunny Side of the Street", "When You're Smiling", "Satin Doll", "Yes Sir, That's My Baby," and particularly "Honeysuckle Rose".

Eight bars:

v^{7}	I^{7}	IV	IV	vi m^{7}	II^{7}	ii m^{7}	V^{7}

== See also ==
- Turnaround (music)
