= Bar-line shift =

Jazz technique

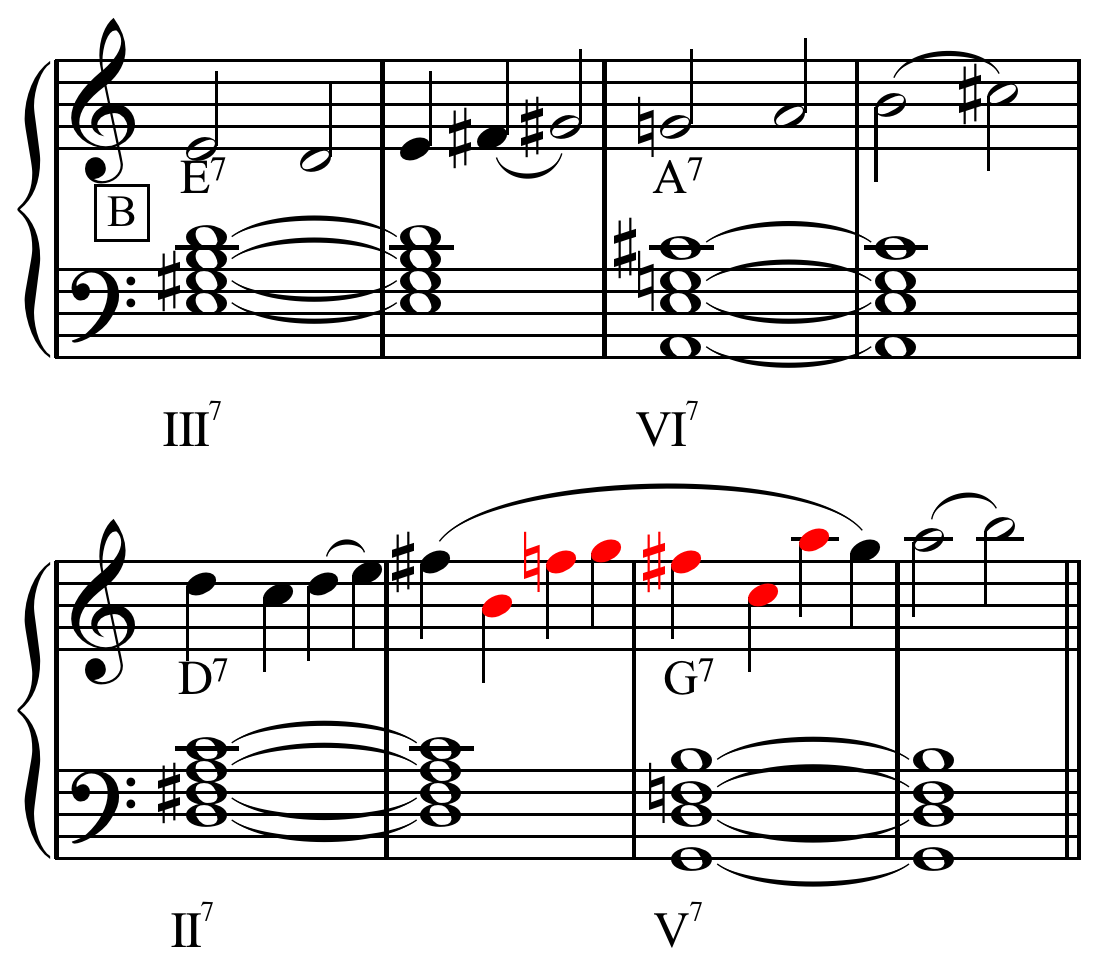
Bar-line shift on rhythm changes B section.

In jazz, a bar-line shift is a technique in which, during improvisation, one plays the chord from the measure before, as an anticipation of a chord, or after the given chord, as a delay, either intentionally or as an "accident."

Bar-line shifts may be caused by a novice having lost their place in the chord progression, but is most often attributable to: "(1)...harmonic generalization, as in the case of playing a II^{ø} to V7 (+5, +9) progression [II-V-I turnaround] as only a V7 (+5, +9); or (2) the player wanted to play the previous chord (though it has already transpired), but was either pausing momentarily (as in taking a breath), and decides to adopt the 'better later than never' attitude." An example of a "very intentional" bar-line shift may be found on Cannonball Adderley's solo on "So What," "in which he deliberately enters and exits the bridge early, causing considerable tension, since the chord of the A section (D-) is one-half step lower than the chord of the bridge (E♭-)." Other notable performers to use this technique include Charlie Parker, Coleman Hawkins, and Pat Metheny.

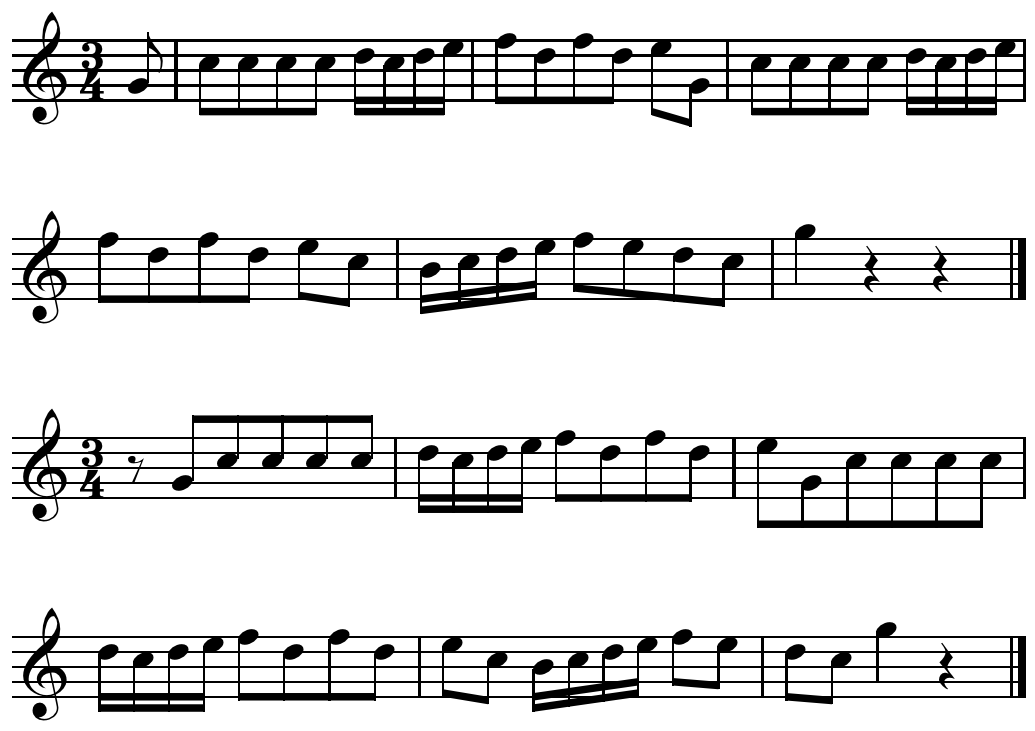
Bar-line shift's effect on metric accent: first two lines vs. second two lines.

Outside of jazz, a bar-line shift may be less than a bar, causing a change in the metric accent of the melody and its cadence.

== See also ==
- Side-slipping
