= Turnaround (music) =

Concept in jazz music

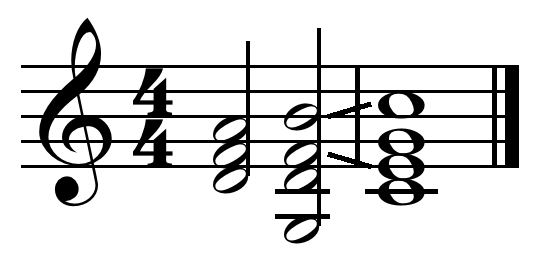
Example of a turn around

In jazz and blues music, a turnaround is a passage at the end of a section which leads to the next section. This next section is most often the repetition of the previous section or the entire piece or song.

The turnaround may lead back to this section either harmonically, as a chord progression, or melodically.

== Typical examples ==
I–vi^{7}–ii–V^{7} turnaround in C

Typical turnarounds in jazz include:

- I–vi–ii–V (ii–V–I turnaround, circle progression)
- I-VI-ii-V
- I–VI–II–V (I–V/ii–V/V–V)
- I–♭iii^{o}–ii^{7}–V^{7}
- I–vi–♭VI^{7♯11}–V
- V–IV–I (blues turnaround)
Tadd Dameron turnaround in C major
- I–♭III–♭VI–♭II^{7} (Tadd Dameron turnaround)
- iii-VI-ii-V

Turnarounds typically begin with the tonic (I) (or a tonic substitute such as iii) and end on the dominant (V^{7}), the next section starting on the tonic (I). They may also end on ♭II^{7} (which is a dominant substitute). Thus when used in a twelve bar blues pattern, the twelfth bar may end on the dominant. All of the chords in a turnaround may be seventh chords, typically dominant seventh chords for major chords and minor seventh chords for minor chords (e.g., ii7).

== Harmonic alternatives ==
Sometimes, especially in blues music, musicians will take chords which are normally minor chords and make them major. The most popular example is the I–VI–ii–V–I progression; normally, the vi chord would be a minor chord (or m^{7}, m^{6}, m^{♭6} etc.) but here the major third makes it a secondary dominant leading to ii, i.e. V/ii. Take the example in C major: C–A–Dm–G^{(7)}. The third of the VI chord (in this case, C♯) allows for chromatic movement from C (the root of I) to C♯ (the third of VI) to D (the root of ii).

Similar chromaticism and harmonic interest can be achieved by the use of a secondary dominant of V, for example V^{7}/V–V^{7}–I (that is, II^{7}–V^{7}–I), instead of ii–V–I. Another popular turnaround which may be considered as a secondary dominant analysis is ii–♭V/V–I (i.e. ii–♭II–I), which is a variation on the standard ii–V–I turnaround. In jazz parlance, use of the ♭II instead of the V is known as tritone substitution. Using ♭V/V instead of V allows for a smooth chromatic descent. Again, let us examine C major; the original turnaround would be Dm–G^{(7)}–C, while the modified would be Dm–D♭–C . The obvious chromatic movement is thorough; it is apparent in the roots (D–D♭–C), thirds (F–F–E; F is often used as a pedal tone), and fifths (A–A♭–G).

While in that particular example the ♭V/V can be considered a Neapolitan chord, the more typical functional analysis in the context of the jazz idiom is that it is not a secondary dominant (♭V^{7}/V) but ♭II^{7}, a substitute dominant (tritone substitution). Harmonically, ♭II^{7} functions exactly as V^{7}/I does, because the two chords enharmonically contain the same tritone, which is the critical harmonic element in the resolution from dominant to tonic. The half step downward motion of the roots of those chords, as seen in ii–♭II^{7}–I, forms the familiar line cliché, arriving satisfyingly at the tonic.

Secondary dominant refers to the functional dominant of the key's dominant or another non-tonic chord, while substitute dominant refers to an alternative functional dominant of the key's tonic. The extending of dominants to secondaries (or beyond) is a practice which remains firmly inside the circle of fifths, while the substitution of dominants replaces that cycle with one of minor-second intervals.

The ragtime progression (E^{7}–A^{7}–D^{7}–G^{7}) often appears in the bridge of jazz standards. The III^{7}–VI^{7}–II^{7}–V^{7} (or V^{7}/V/V/V–V^{7}/V/V–V^{7}/V–V^{7}) leads back to C major (I) but is itself indefinite in key.

I–vi–ii–V may be transformed through various chord substitutions. For example, the vi and ii chords may be substituted with dominant chords, giving I–VI^{7}–II^{7}–V or C–A^{7}–D^{7}–G, the ragtime progression. The tritone substitution may be applied to the vi and V chords, giving C–E♭^{7}–D^{7}–D♭^{7}, or to every chord but the I, giving C–E♭^{7}–A♭^{M7}–D♭^{7}.

== See also ==
- Approach chord
- Backdoor progression
- Montgomery-Ward bridge
- Passing chord
- Sears Roebuck bridge
