= ♭VII–V7 cadence =

Musical resolution from chord progression

A ♭VII–V^{7}–I cadence in C

In music, the ♭VII–V^{7} cadence is a cadence using the chord progression from the subtonic (♭VII) to the dominant seventh (V^{7}). It resolves to I making the full cadence ♭VII–V^{7}–I.

A "mainstay in all rock styles of the '60s", the cadence, heard perhaps most canonically (and often) in Billy J. Kramer's "Little Children", can also be found in such hits as Otis Redding's "(Sittin' On) The Dock of the Bay", Link Wray and His Ray Men's "Rumble", Duane Eddy's "Because They're Young", the Velvet Underground & Nico's "Sunday Morning" and "Femme Fatale", Joan Baez's "Fare Thee Well", and Al Caiola's 1961 "The Magnificent Seven" (0:15–0:17) and "Bonanza" (0:26–0:27).

The cadence has also been considered an important harmonic technique used in film scores. Though it is particularly frequent in scores to Westerns, it is present throughout the genre.

== ♭III–V^{7} cadence ==
A ♭III–V^{7}–I cadence in C

A similar cadence to the ♭VII–V^{7} cadence is the ♭III–V^{7} cadence. In the key of C, this would be E♭–G^{7}–C (♭III–V^{7}–I). Both the ♭VII and ♭III are altered chords or chords borrowed from the variant minor.

This cadence occurs in The Beatles' "Something", Leroy Anderson's "Sleigh Ride", and Muse's "New Born".

== See also ==
- Backdoor progression
