= Tadd Dameron turnaround =

Chord progression

In jazz, the Tadd Dameron turnaround, named for jazz composer Tadd Dameron, "is a very common turnaround in the jazz idiom", derived from a typical I−vi−ii−V turnaround through the application of tritone substitution of all but the first chord.

== Construction ==
Tadd Dameron turnaround in C major with major seventh chords

In C major, the Tadd Dameron turnaround is

| C	E♭^{7}	| A♭^{7}	D♭^{7}	|

Conventional progression without tritone substitution (i.e., NOT a Tadd Dameron turnaround)

rather than the more conventional

| C	Am^{7}	| Dm^{7}	G^{7}	|

The Tadd Dameron turnaround may feature major seventh chords, and derive from the following series of substitutions, each altering the chord quality.

| C^{∆7}	Am^{7}	| Dm^{7}	G^{7}	|	(original)
| C^{∆7}	A^{7}	| D^{7}	G^{7}	|	(dominant for minor triad)
| C^{∆7}	E♭^{7}	| A♭^{7}	D♭^{7}	|	(Dameron turnaround: tritone substitution)
| C^{∆7}	E♭^{∆7}	| A♭^{∆7}	D♭^{∆7}	|	(major for dominant seventh)

The last step, changing to the major seventh chord, is optional.

== History ==
"One of the most famous improvised lines that outlines the Dameron turnaround"

Dameron was the first composer to use the turnaround in his standard "Lady Bird", which contains a modulation down a major third (from C to A♭). This key relation is also implied by the first and third chord of the turnaround, C^{∆7} and A♭^{∆7}. It has been suggested that this motion down by major thirds would eventually lead to John Coltrane's Coltrane changes. The Dameron turnaround has alternately been called the "Coltrane turnaround".

Further examples of pieces including this turnaround are Miles Davis's "Half Nelson" and John Carisi's "Israel".
