= Dominant cadence =

Dominant cadence may refer to:

- ii-V-I turnaround
- Cadence (music)#Half cadence
