= Sidestep =

Sidestep may refer to:

- Avoidance behavior
- SideStep, a travel Internet search engine
- Side-slipping, in jazz music
