= Circle of thirds =

Method of organizing pitches and keys

In music theory, the circle of thirds, also known as the cycle of thirds, is a way of organizing pitches, and a musical tool that helps musicians remember and memorize the order of thirds in a scale, and hence the notes of the chords in those scales. The circle of thirds is not as well known or as versatile as the circle of fifths, but it can still be a valuable concept for musicians. For example, the cycle of thirds is inherently relevant to chord construction, as most triads are built from thirds.

Because the circle of thirds is based on the order of thirds in a scale, rather than its ascending scale degrees, the scale degrees of the cycle are in the following order: 1-3-5-7-2-4-6. In the key of C, the order of notes will be C-E-G-B-D-F-A. However, when in a key other than C, the order won't start from C but will still be the same overall order when seen as a circle. For example, for A minor, it is A-C-E-G-B-D-F.

The circle of thirds can be played by alternating intervals of a major and minor third in one direction.

== History ==
=== Origins ===
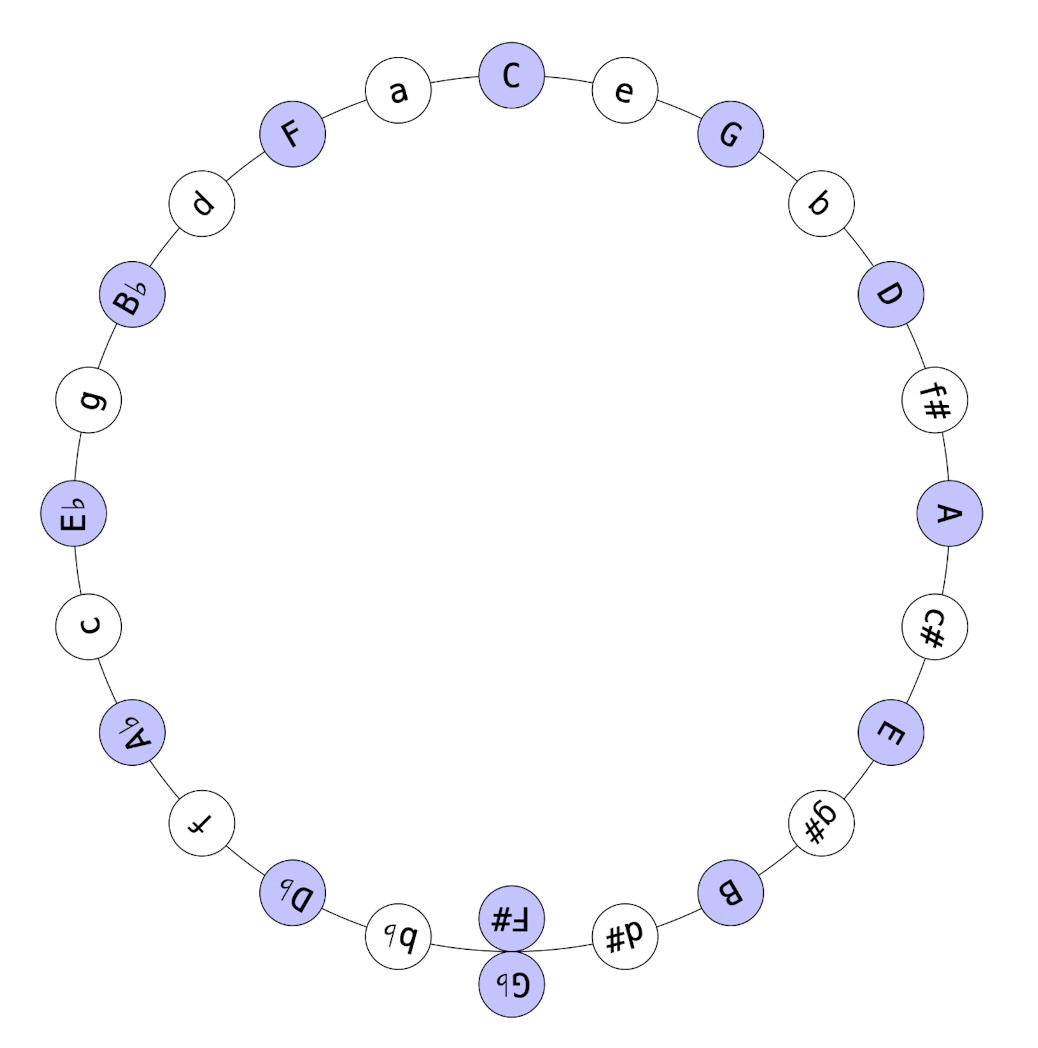
Circle of thirds

The concept of a circle of thirds is relatively new in the history of music. Though not the first to use it, the popular American jazz musician John Coltrane often used a cycle composed of a sequence of major thirds for his unique chord changes, known as the Coltrane changes. His popularity throughout the 1960s and ensuing decades brought much attention to the use of augmented triads, and to the concept of a cycle of thirds, which was mainly inspired by the Coltrane changes.

The circle of thirds and the Coltrane changes continue to be used in many jazz compositions to this day, and have extended their reach into other musical genres, such as rock, pop, and other forms of popular music. Less commonly, the circle of thirds is also mentioned in relation to tonal music.

== Structure and modern usage ==
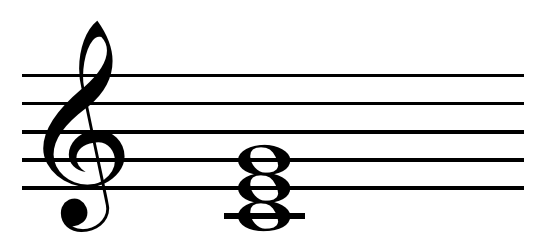
The C major triad mentioned on the left, as seen in traditional sheet music.

=== Chord construction ===
Because triads are typically built from successive thirds, by proceeding through the repeating 24-note sequence of the circle of thirds, many chords can be constructed.

F#/G♭–b♭–D♭–f–A♭–c–E♭–g–B♭–d–F–a–C–e–G–b–D–f#–A–c#–E–g#–B–d#–F#/G♭

For example, in A major, the first notes in the cycle of thirds are A, C♯, and E, constituting the tonic triad. Extending further, this process can also generate seventh chords. In the key of E minor, the tonic triad (E, G, B) becomes a tonic minor seventh chord (E, G, B, D) if the next note (D) is added to the triad. This applies to all other chords in the scale.

Within the circle of thirds, the sequence DFACEGB appears three times:

[D♭, F, A♭, C, E♭, G, B♭], [D, F, A, C, E, G, B], [D, F#, A, C#, E, G#, B]

The first above sequence is associated with the major scales and chords commonly notated with flatted notes (D♭, A♭, E♭, B♭), while the third sequence is associated with the scales and chords that contain sharp notes (D, A, E, B).

== Relationship to other scales ==
The circle of thirds is primarily based on, and closely tied to, the diatonic scale. Any minor triad within the circle of thirds can be extended by sequence into a 7-note Dorian scale, or mode thereof. For example, the scale DFACEGB contains all the notes in D Dorian and D Dorian's associated modes.

Modes Associated with D Dorian
Mode	Notes
D Dorian	D, E, F, G, A, B, C
E Phrygian	E, F, G, A, B, C, D
F Lydian	F, G, A, B, C, D, E
G Mixolydian	G, A, B, C, D, E, F
A Aeolian	A, B, C, D, E, F, G
B Locrian	B, C, D, E, F, G, A
C Ionian	C, D, E, F, G, A, B

== Relationship to other circles ==
The circle of thirds is related to the circle of fifths. The circle of fifths is composed of the twelve Major keys in the order (C, G, D, A, E, B, F#/G♭, D♭, A♭, E♭, B♭, F) going clockwise. The circle of fifths can also be drawn as a circle of the associated minor keys in the order (Am, Em, Bm, F#m, C#m, G#m, D#m, B♭m, Fm, Cm, Gm, Dm). The circle of thirds is the circle of fifths' Major keys, preceded by each associated minor key.

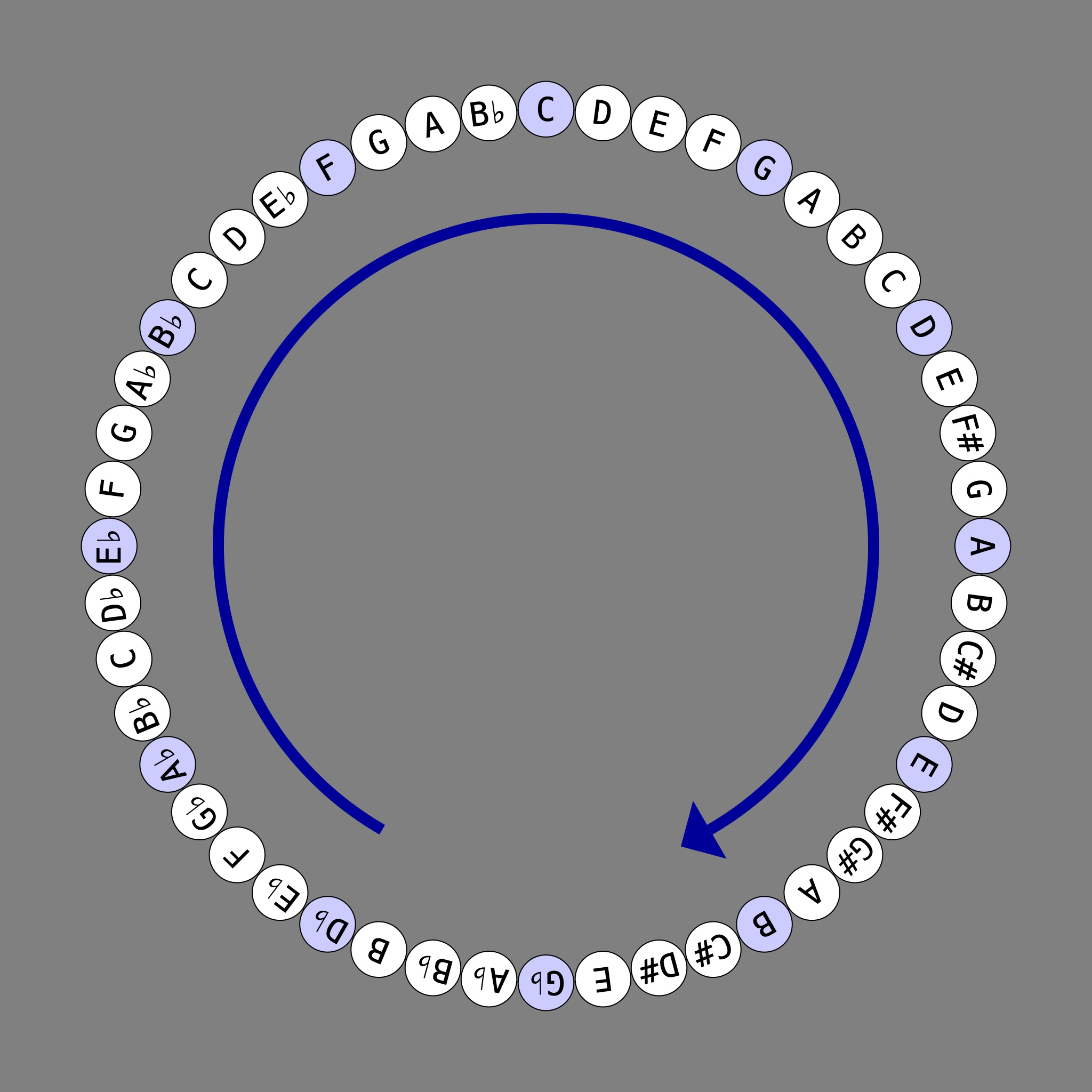
This cycle of 48 notes represents the first four notes of each major scale, following the order of keys around the circle of fifths.

The jump pattern 15263748... repeating around the circle of thirds will generate a 48 note cycle of modular arithmetic (modulo 12) that groups common tones together.

C, D, E, F, G, A, B, C, D, E, F#, G, A, B, C#, D, E, F#, G#, A, B, C#, D#, E, G♭, A♭, B♭, B, D♭, E♭, F, G♭, A♭, B♭, C, D♭, E♭, F, G, A♭, B♭, C, D, E♭, F, G, A, B♭

This cycle of 48 notes is a sequence of the first four notes of each major scale in the order of fifths from the circle of fifths. This cycle also contains all the Major/Ionian scales (overlapping) in the order of fifths with Dorian, Phrygian and Lydian modes also included for each Major group (e.g. C Ionian, D Dorian, E Phrygian, F Lydian).

== See also ==
- Circle of fifths
- Triads
- Coltrane changes
- Major third
- Minor third
