= When You're Smiling =

1928 pop song

- Sheet music, 1928

Song
- Published: 1928 by Mills Music
- Songwriters: Larry Shay, Mark Fisher, Joe Goodwin

"When You're Smiling" is a popular song written by Larry Shay, Mark Fisher and Joe Goodwin, published in 1928. Popular recordings were made by Seger Ellis (1928), Louis Armstrong (1929), Ted Wallace & His Campus Boys (1930), and Louis Prima (1957).

The lyrics and music of the song entered the public domain in the United States in 2024.

It is the unofficial anthem of Leicester City Football Club, adopted by fans in the 1980s. As of 2022, the recording by Jersey Budd is played before the start of each home match.

== Other notable recordings ==
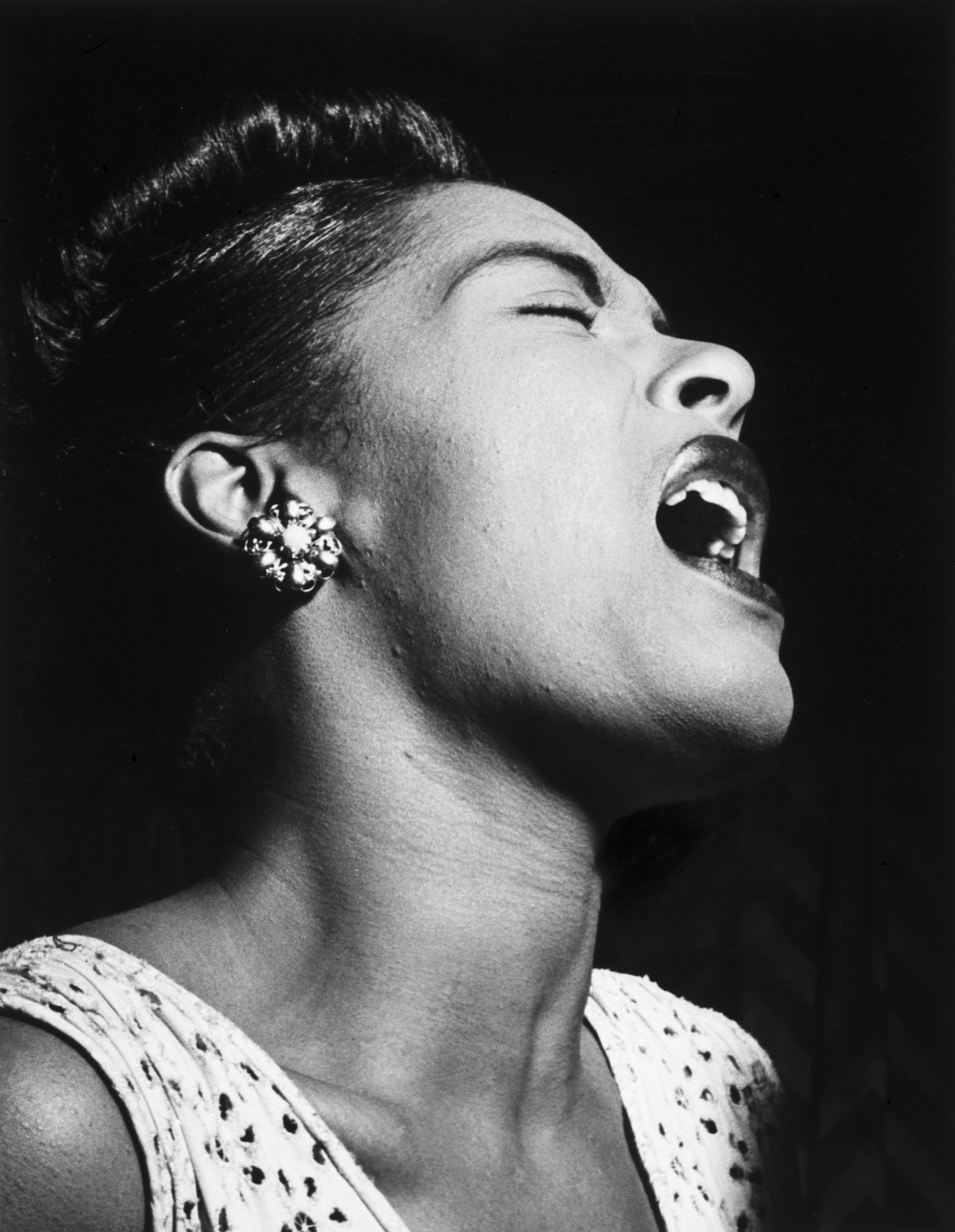
Billie Holiday, here depicted in February 1947, recorded this song on January 6, 1938, with Teddy Wilson & His Orchestra.

- Frank Sinatra made several recordings with two studio releases in 1950, 1961
- Cliff Bruner's Texas Wanderers – recorded September 13, 1938, it reached the country charts in 1939. This version was sung by singer pianist Moon Mullican.
- Louis Armstrong – Satchmo: A Musical Autobiography (1956). In his recording from 1929, Armstrong tried to adapt the "white" style of Guy Lombardo through the inclusion of an expansive saxophone section sound.
- In 2013, Dan Zanes and Elizabeth Mitchell did a recording of this song for the album Turn Turn Turn.

== See also ==
- Montgomery-Ward bridge
