= Ernő Lendvai =

Hungarian music theorist (1925-1993)

- Born: 6 February 1925; Kaposvár, Somogy County
- Died: 31 January 1993 (aged 67); Budapest

Ernő Lendvai (6 February 1925 – 31 January 1993) was one of the first music theorists to write on the appearance of the golden section and Fibonacci series and how these are implemented in Bartók's music. He also formulated the axis system, acoustic scale and alpha chord.

Lendvai was married to the pianist Erzsébet Tusa, and together they moved to Szombathely in 1949 to run a local music school.

== Selected works ==
=== In Hungarian ===
- Szimmetria a zenében (Kodály Intézet, 1994)
- Verdi and Wagner (Bartók and the 19th century) (Kahn & Averill, 1988)
- Verdi és a 20. század: A Falstaff hangzás-dramaturgiája (Zeneműkiadó, 1984)
- Polimodális kromatika (Kodály Zoltán Zenepedagógiai Intézet, 1980)
- Bartók és Kodály harmóniavilága (Zeneműkiadó, 1975)
- Bartók Dramaturgiája (Zeneműkiadó Vállalat, Budapest, 1964)

=== In German ===
- Bartók's Dichterische Welt (Akkord Music Publishers, 2001)
- Lendvai, Ernő (1972), "Einführung in die Formen- und Harmoniewelt Bartóks (1953)", in Szabolcsi, Bence (ed.), Béla Bartók, Weg und Werk, Schriften und Briege (in German), Kassel: Bärenreiter, OCLC 750457462

=== In English ===
- Lendvai, Ernő (1971), Béla Bartók: An Analysis of His Music, Introduction by Alan Bush, London: Kahn & Averill, ISBN 9780900707049, OCLC 240301
- Bartók's Style (Akkord Music Publishers, 1999)
- Verdi and Wagner (Bartók and the 19th century) (Kahn & Averill, 1988)
- The workshop of Bartók and Kodály (Editio Musica, 1983)
- Bartók and Kodály (Institute for Culture, 1980)
- Symmetries of Music
