= Satin Doll =

1953 song composed by Duke Ellington

Song
- Published: 1953
- Genre: Jazz standard
- Composers: Duke Ellington, Billy Strayhorn
- Lyricist: Johnny Mercer

"Satin Doll" is a jazz standard written by Duke Ellington and Billy Strayhorn with lyrics by Johnny Mercer. Written in 1953, the song has been recorded by Ella Fitzgerald, Carmen McRae, Billy Eckstine, Nancy Wilson, Bobby Short, and many other vocalists. As an instrumental, it has been recorded by hundreds of jazz artists. Its chord progression is well known for its unusual use of chords and opening with a ii–V–I turnaround.

== Background ==
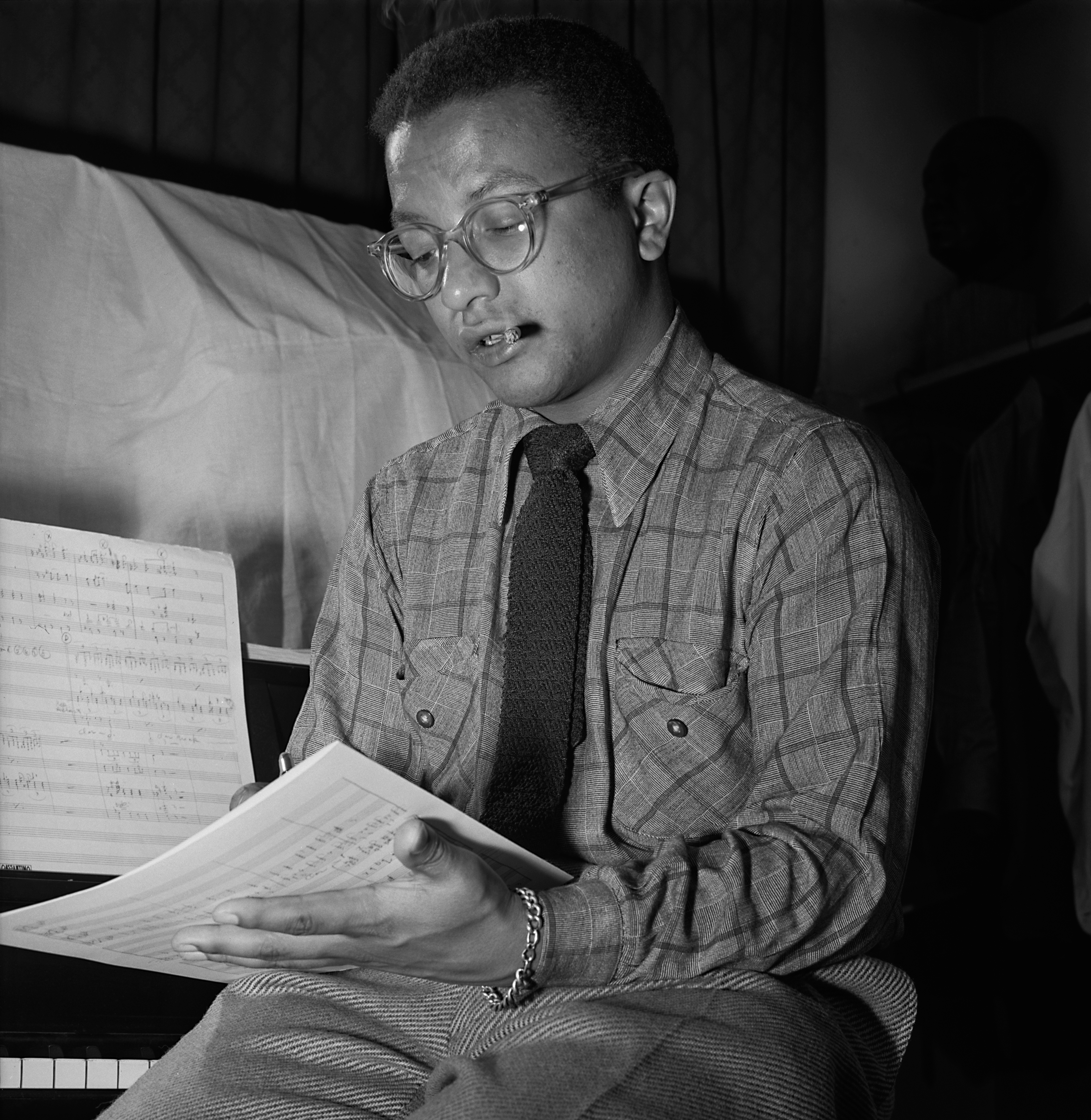
Billy Strayhorn

According to Strayhorn biographer David Hajdu, Ellington wrote the main melodic themes for "Satin Doll", then asked Strayhorn to harmonize and orchestrate the tune and write an original lyric. Hajdu wrote that Strayhorn did pen a lyric for the song that was a tribute to Strayhorn's mother (whom Strayhorn called "Satin Doll"), but that Strayhorn's lyric was not performed and is now lost. The Duke Ellington Orchestra recorded the piece as an instrumental in 1953, and the song charted that same year and remained popular through the 1950s.

Around 1959, Johnny Mercer was asked to write a new lyric for the song. An instrumental version by guitarist Johnny Smith released in 1959 lists Mercer as a composer, though the copyright registration for the version of the song with Mercer's lyric was not filed until 1960.

== Commercial recordings ==
- Duke Ellington – Capitol Sessions 1953–1955 (1953, instrumental)
- Ella Fitzgerald – Ella Fitzgerald Sings the Duke Ellington Songbook (1957, with scat vocal); Ella in Hollywood (1961, with Mercer lyric); Ella and Basie! (1963, with Mercer lyric)
- Barney Kessel, Shelly Manne, Ray Brown – The Poll Winners (1957)
- The Gaylords – 1958 (vocal, features uncredited lyric that differs from the Mercer lyric)
- Bill Doggett – Salute to Duke Ellington (King, 1959)
- George Shearing (instrumental) – Beauty And The Beat! (Capitol Records, 1959, with Peggy Lee on other songs)
- The Coasters – One by One (1960)
- Harry James – Harry James...Today (MGM, 1960)
- McCoy Tyner – Nights of Ballads & Blues (1963)
- Bud Powell – Bud Powell in Paris/Writin' for Duke (1963, produced and arranged by Ellington)
- The Impressions – The Never Ending Impressions (1964)
- Blossom Dearie – Blossom Time at Ronnie's (1966)
- Kimiko Kasai – Satin Doll (CBS/Sony, 1972) - with Gil Evans Orchestra
- Bobbi Humphrey – Satin Doll (1974)
- Chicago – Chicago VIII (1974)
- Terry Callier – I Just Can't Help Myself (1974)
- Oscar Peterson and Clark Terry – Oscar Peterson & Clark Terry (1975)
- Anita O'Day – My Ship (1975)
- Joe Sample – The Three (1975)
- The Stylistics – Once Upon a Jukebox (1976)
- Dewey Redman – African Venus (1992)
- Dave Grusin – Homage to Duke (1993)
- Buddy Emmons & Ray Pennington with the Swing Shift Band – It's All In The Swing (1994)
- Dr. John – Duke Elegant (1999)
- James Darren – This One's from the Heart (1999)
- Hank Jones – Someday My Prince Will Come (2002)

== See also ==
- Montgomery-Ward bridge
