= Countdown (John Coltrane song) =

Composition by John Coltrane

from the album Giant Steps
- Released: 1960
- Recorded: May 4, 1959
- Studio: Atlantic Studios, New York
- Genre: Jazz; hard bop
- Length: 2:25
- Label: Atlantic Records
- Composer: John Coltrane
- Producer: Nesuhi Ertegün

"Countdown" is a hardbop jazz standard composed by American jazz saxophonist John Coltrane that was first featured on his fifth studio album, Giant Steps, in 1960. The song is a contrafact of Miles Davis's "Tune Up", which is reharmonized to the Coltrane changes. The original recording has been described as having "resolute intensity . . . [that] does more to modernize jazz in 141 seconds than many artists do in their entire careers".

== Composition ==
Chord changes
E-7 F7	B♭Δ7 D♭7	G♭Δ7 A7	DΔ7
D-7 E♭7	A♭Δ7 B7	EΔ7 G7	CΔ7
C-7 D♭7	G♭Δ7 A7	DΔ7 F7	B♭Δ7
E-7	F7	B♭Δ7	A7 (Note: Some charts also have the final chord as an E♭7(♯11).)

Head out
E-7 F7	B♭Δ7 D♭7	G♭Δ7 F7	B♭Δ7 A7
DΔ7 B♭Δ7	G♭Δ7 DΔ7	B♭Δ7 G♭Δ7	D♭Δ7

The song is a 16-bar form. Each four bars incorporate the same tonal centers of "Tune Up", which are D major, C major, and B♭ major.

Each tonal center begins with the ii chord but then cycles through two different keys before arriving at the I chord. The ii chord is followed by a dominant 7 chord that is a half step above—using the first four bars as an example, this would be Em7 and F7. This dominant 7 chord resolves in a V-I manner—F7 to B♭Δ7. The next key center is cycled to by playing the dominant 7th chord a minor third up from the last key center—D♭7 to G♭Δ7 to A7 to DΔ7. The next four bars, and new key, starts by making the I chord the ii of the next key.

== Notable recordings ==
- John Coltrane in Giant Steps (1960)
- Benny Green Quintet in Prelude (1989)
- Billy Harper in Live on Tour in the Far East (1991)
- Brad Mehldau in Introducing Brad Mehldau (1995)
- Allan Holdsworth in None Too Soon (1996)
- Kenny Garrett in Pursuance: The Music of John Coltrane (1996)
- Steve Kuhn in Countdown (1998)
- Brad Mehldau Trio in Brad Mehldau Trio Live (2008)
- Victor Bailey in Slippin' N' Trippin' (2009)
- Joey Alexander in Countdown (2016)
- Simon Moullier Trio in Countdown (2020)
- Michael Sagmeister in Story Board (2021)

== See also ==
- Coltrane changes
