= Lady Bird (composition) =

1939 Jazz standard by Tadd Dameron

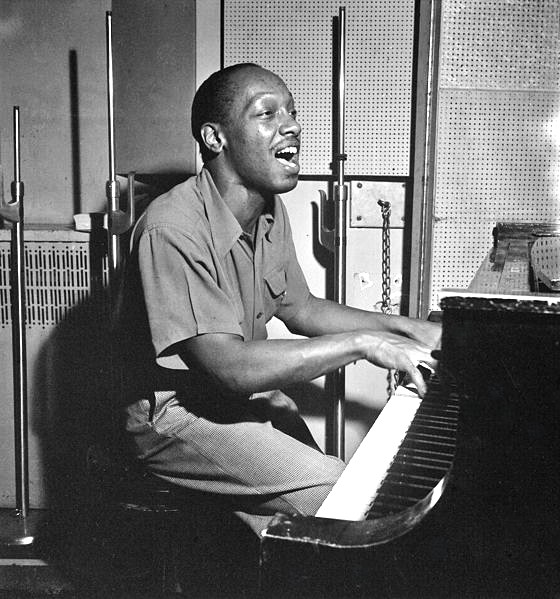
Composer Tadd Dameron

"Lady Bird" is a sixteen-bar jazz standard by Tadd Dameron. This "celebrated" composition, "one of the most performed in modern jazz", was written around 1939, and released in 1948. Featuring, "a suave, mellow theme," it is the origin of the Tadd Dameron turnaround (in C: CM^{7} E♭^{7} A♭M^{7} D♭^{7} CM^{7}).

An example of Dameron's interest in keys and/or roots related by thirds, the piece is in binary form (AABC) and features, through the use of ii-V turnarounds, movement toward three keys other than the tonic; E♭, A♭, and G. The first three four-measure phrases end with secondary ii-V's, while the last ends instead with the Tadd Dameron turnaround resolving to the tonic.

IM7         | IM7         | ii7/♭III    | V7/♭III     |
IM7         | IM7         | ii7/♭VI     | V7/♭VI      |
♭VIM7       | ♭VIM7       | ii7/V       | V7/V        |
ii7         | V7          | IM7 ♭III7  | ♭VIM7 ♭II7 :|| IM7 ||

It has been recorded by Art Blakey, Don Byas, Miles Davis, Stan Getz, Dexter Gordon, Charles Mingus, Gerry Mulligan, Bud Powell, Chet Baker, Mary Lou Williams, Tete Montoliu, Horace Parlan, Andy LaVerne, and Barry Harris, as well as Tommy Flanagan and Hank Jones.

Miles Davis's "Half Nelson" uses, except for measures seven and eight, the same chord progression as "Lady Bird". Davis's "Lazy Susan" is also a contrafact of the Dameron piece.

Stanley Cornfield wrote lyrics to the song. The first line is "We fit together like two birds of a feather."

== See also ==
- Major seventh chord
