= Backdoor progression =

Jazz chord progression

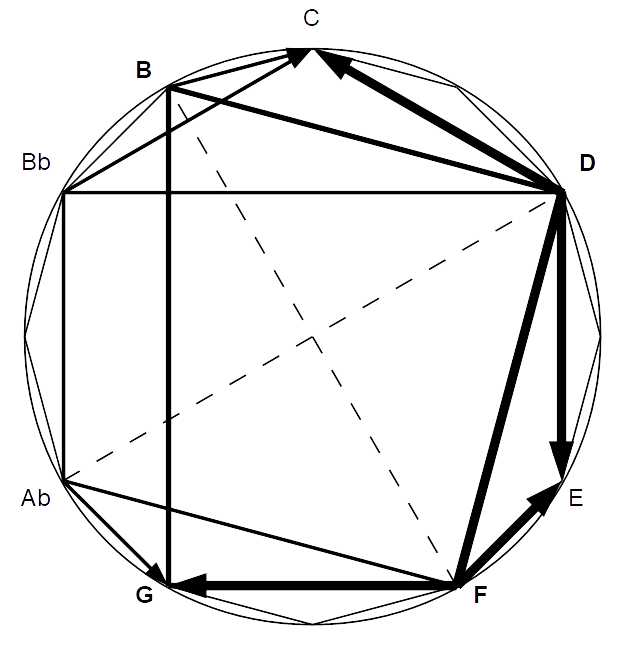
Backdoor compared with the dominant (front door) in the chromatic circle: they share two tones and are transpositionally equivalent.

In jazz and jazz harmony, the chord progression from iv^{7} to ♭VII^{7} to I (the tonic or "home" chord) has been nicknamed the backdoor progression or the backdoor ii–V, as described by jazz theorist and author Jerry Coker. This name derives from an assumption that the normal progression to the tonic, the ii–V–I turnaround (ii–V^{7} to I, see also authentic cadence) is, by inference, the "front door", a metaphor suggesting that this is the main route to the tonic.

The ♭VII^{7} chord, a pivot chord borrowed from the parallel minor of the current tonic major key, is a dominant seventh. Therefore, it can resolve to I; it is commonly preceded by IV going to iv, then ♭VII^{7}, then I. In C major the dominant would be G^{7}: (the notes GBDF), sharing two common tones with B♭^{7}: (the notes B♭DFA♭). The notes A♭ and F serve as upper leading-tones back to G and E (when the chord moves to the tonic, C major), respectively, rather than B♮ and F serving as the lower and upper leading-tones to C and E in a conventional G7–C major (V7–I) cadence.

A backdoor IV–V is also possible, moving from ♭VI^{M7} to ♭VII^{7} to I. This is also commonly known as a "Mario Cadence", after the end-of-level music in Super Mario Bros.

Another way to conceptualise the back door progression is with reference to the Axis System.

== Alternative usage ==
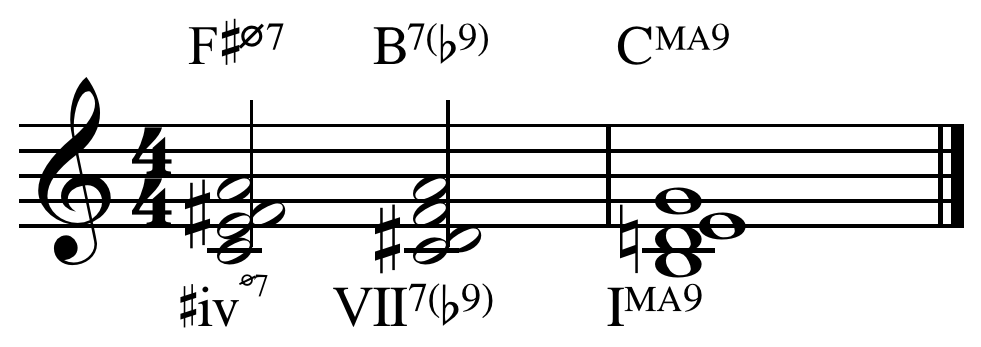
Berg's "Backdoor progression" to iii, with I in place of iii: ♯iv^{ø}^{7}–VII^{7(♭9)}–I^{maj9}

The term "Backdoor" has been used by author Shelton Berg to refer to another entirely unrelated progression. The unexpected modulation created through the substitution of the highly similar I^{maj9} for iii^{7} (in C: CEGBD and EGBD) at the end of the ii^{ø}^{7}–V^{7} turnaround to a tonicized iii (ii^{ø}^{7}/iii=♯iv^{ø}^{7}, V^{7}/iii=VII^{7}, iii), arrives at 'home' (the temporary tonic of iii) through unexpected means, the 'back door' instead of the 'front door'(iii^{7}, the individual notes EGBD, being entirely contained within I^{maj9}, the individual notes of the C major chord, CEGBD, and the seventh of the dominant seventh chord still resolving downward). The resolution of a dominant seventh chord up a step (in this case a half-step, also called a semitone) is called a deceptive cadence.

== See also ==
- ♭VII–V7 cadence
- Axis System
