= Coltrane changes =

Harmonic progression

Coltrane changes (Coltrane Matrix or cycle, also known as chromatic third relations and multi-tonic changes) are a harmonic progression variation using substitute chords over common jazz chord progressions. These substitution patterns were first demonstrated by jazz musician John Coltrane on the albums Bags & Trane (on the track "Three Little Words") and Cannonball Adderley Quintet in Chicago (on "Limehouse Blues"). Coltrane continued his explorations on the 1960 album Giant Steps and expanded on the substitution cycle in his compositions "Giant Steps" and "Countdown", the latter of which is a reharmonized version of Eddie Vinson's "Tune Up". The Coltrane changes are a standard advanced harmonic substitution used in jazz improvisation.

== Function ==
The changes serve as a pattern of chord substitutions for the ii–V–I progression (supertonic–dominant–tonic) and are noted for the tonally unusual root movement by major thirds (either up or down by a major third interval), creating an augmented triad. Root movement by thirds is unusual in jazz, as the norm is circle of fifths root movement, such as ii-V-I.

== Influences ==
David Demsey, saxophonist and coordinator of jazz studies at William Paterson University, cites a number of influences leading to Coltrane's development of these changes. After Coltrane's death it was proposed that his "preoccupation with...chromatic third-relations" was inspired by religion or spirituality, with three equal key areas having numerological significance representing a "magic triangle", or, "the trinity, God, or unity." Demsey shows that though this meaning was of some importance, third relationships were much more "earthly", or rather historical, in origin. Mention should be made of his interests in Indian ragas during the early 1960s, the Trimurti of Vishnu, Brahma and Shiva may well have been an inherent reference in his chromatic third relations, tritone substitutes, and so on. In playing that style, Coltrane found it "easy to apply the harmonic ideas I had.... I started experimenting because I was striving for more individual development." He developed his sheets of sound style while playing with Miles Davis and with pianist Thelonious Monk during this period. In terms of the origin of this “sheets of sound” technique, saxophonist Odean Pope considers pianist Hasaan Ibn Ali a major influence on Coltrane and his development of this signature style.

Coltrane studied harmony with Dennis Sandole and at the Granoff School of Music in Philadelphia. He explored contemporary techniques and theory. He also studied the Thesaurus of Scales and Melodic Patterns by Nicolas Slonimsky (1947).

The bridge of the Richard Rodgers song and jazz standard "Have You Met Miss Jones?" (1937) predated Tadd Dameron's "Lady Bird", after which Coltrane named his "Lazy Bird", by incorporating modulation by major third(s). (highlighted yellow below) "Giant Steps" and "Countdown" may both have taken the inspiration for their augmented tonal cycles from "Have You Met Miss Jones?".

"Have You Met Miss Jones?" B section chord progression (bridge):
│
B♭^{Maj7}

│
A♭m^{7}
D♭^{7}
│
G♭^{Maj7}

│
Em^{7}
A^{7}
│
D^{Maj7}

│
A♭m^{7}
D♭^{7}
│
G♭^{Maj7}

│
Gm^{7}
C^{7}
│

Play the chord progression for the "Have You Met Miss Jones?" bridge section

== Coltrane substitution ==
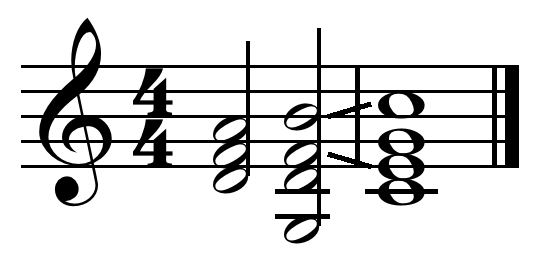
ii–V^{7}–I progression in C lasting only two measures.

The Coltrane substitution, Coltrane changes, or Countdown formula, is as follows. Start with a ii–V–I turnaround lasting four measures:

	ii^{7}		V^{7}		I		I
│	Dm^{7}	│	G^{7}	│	C	│	C	│

with the dominant chord (V^{7}) preceding the tonic (I).

One substitutes two chords for each of the first three:

	ii^{7}										V^{7}		I
│	Dm^{7}		E♭^{7}	│	A♭		B^{7}	│	E		G^{7}	│	C	│
		╲╱ m2		╲╱ P4		╲╱ m3		╲╱ P4		╲╱ m3		╲╱ P4

Notice a dominant seventh chord preceding and thus tonicizing a major chord on C and also E and A♭, both a major third from C.

V^{7}		I	V^{7}		I	V^{7}		I
E♭^{7}	│	A♭	B^{7}	│	E	G^{7}	│	C

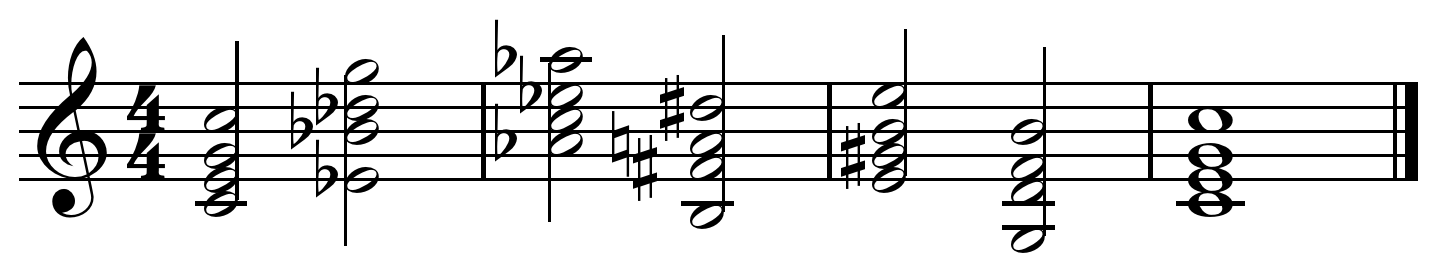
Four-measure ii–V–I progression in C with Coltrane substitution.

This also may begin on C, as on "Giant Steps", giving:

│	C		E♭^{7}	│	A♭		B^{7}	│	E		G^{7}	│	C	│
		╲╱ m3		╲╱ P4		╲╱ m3		╲╱ P4		╲╱ m3		╲╱ P4

== Major thirds cycle ==
The harmonic use of the chromatic third relation originated in the Romantic era and may occur on any structural level, for example in chord progressions or through key changes. The standard Western chromatic scale has twelve equidistant semitones. When arranged according to the circle of fifths, it looks like this:

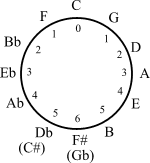

Precisely because of this equidistancy, the roots of these three chords can produce a destabilizing effect; if C, A♭ and E appear as the tonic pitches of three key areas on a larger level, the identity of the composition's tonal center can only be determined by the closure of the composition.

— Demsey (1991)

Looking above at the marked chords from "Have You Met Miss Jones?", B♭, G♭ and D are spaced a major third apart. On the circle of fifths it appears as an equilateral triangle:

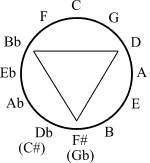

By rotating the triangle, all of the thirds cycles can be shown. Note that there are only four unique thirds cycles. This approach can be generalized; different interval cycles will appear as different polygons on the diagram.

== Musical examples ==
=== Tune Up ===
These are the first eight bars of the Miles Davis composition "Tune Up". The chord changes are relatively simple, a straightforward application of the ii–V–I progression, which is extremely common in jazz.

	ii		V		I				ii		V		I
│	Em^{7}	│	A^{7}	│	D^{Maj7}	│	D^{Maj7}	│	Dm^{7}	│	G^{7}	│	C^{Maj7}	│	C^{Maj7}	│

Play this "Tune Up" excerpt chord progression

The chord progression is a standard ii^{7}–V^{7}–I progression in D major and then in C major. Assume that the time signature is 4/4 and that each ii and V chord gets four beats and the I chord gets eight beats.

=== Countdown ===
The changes below show Coltrane's substitution of chord changes over "Tune Up". The ii–V–I progression from "Tune Up" still appears but is enhanced with several transition chords that lead to a more complex harmonic progression.

	ii							V		I		ii							V		I
│	Em^{7}	F^{7}	│	B♭^{Maj7}	D♭^{7}	│	G♭^{Maj7}	A^{7}	│	D^{Maj7}	│	Dm^{7}	E♭^{7}	│	A♭^{Maj7}	B^{7}	│	E^{Maj7}	G^{7}	│	C^{Maj7}	│

Play this "Countdown" excerpt chord progression

In the standard Coltrane change cycle the ii–V–I is substituted with a progression of chords that cycle back to the V–I at the end. In a 4/4 piece, each chord gets two beats per change.

Coltrane developed this modified chord progression for "Countdown", which is much more complex. At its core, "Countdown" is a variation of "Tune Up", but the harmonic substitutions occur rapidly and trick the listener into thinking that they are listening to a completely unrelated tune. The ii, V and I remain, but in between are other chords (highlighted in yellow and blue) from the major thirds cycle centered around each I. Preceding the first chord of each major thirds cycle is its V chord.

An earlier Coltrane piece, "Lazy Bird", also features two tonal centers a major third apart in its A section.

=== Giant Steps ===
The "Giant Steps" cycle is the culmination of Coltrane's theories applied to a completely new chord progression. Coltrane uses the cycle in descending major third tonal transpositions in the opening bars and then ascending ii–V–I progressions separated by a major third in the second section of "Giant Steps". The second section is basically the inverse of the bridge section described in "Have You Met Miss Jones" above.

	I	Coltrane substitution cycle							ii	V		I	Coltrane substitution cycle
│	B^{Maj7}	D^{7}	│	G^{Maj7}	B♭^{7}	│	E♭^{Maj7}	│	Am^{7}	D^{7}	│	G^{Maj7}	B♭^{7}	│	E♭^{Maj7}	F♯^{7}	│	B^{Maj7}	│

The structure of "Giant Steps" as shown on the circle of fifths.

Ascending/descending ii–V–I progression separated by a major third (tonal centers E♭, G, B, E♭, B)

	ii	V		I		ii	V		I		ii	V		I		ii	V		I		ii	V
│	Fm^{7}	B♭^{7}	│	E♭^{Maj7}	│	Am^{7}	D^{7}	│	G^{Maj7}	│	C♯m^{7}	F♯^{7}	│	B^{Maj7}	│	Fm^{7}	B♭^{7}	│	E♭^{Maj7}	│	C♯m^{7}	F♯^{7}	│

This table shows which scales are used for the different chords:

Chords	Scale	Change in scale
B^{Maj7}	B major	I
D^{7} → G^{Maj7}	G major	V-I
B♭^{7} → E♭^{Maj7}	E♭ major	V-I
Am^{7} → D^{7} → G^{Maj7}	G major	ii-V-I
B♭^{7} → E♭^{Maj7}	E♭ major	V-I
F♯^{7} → B^{Maj7}	B major	V-I
Fm^{7} → B♭^{7} → E♭^{Maj7}	E♭ major	ii-V-I
Am^{7} → D^{7} → G^{Maj7}	G major	ii-V-I
C♯m^{7} → F♯^{7} → B^{Maj7}	B major	ii-V-I
Fm^{7} → B♭^{7} → E♭^{Maj7}	E♭ major	ii-V-I
C♯m^{7} → F♯^{7}	B major	ii-V

== Standard substitution ==
Although "Giant Steps" and "Countdown" are perhaps the most famous examples, both use slight variants of the standard Coltrane changes (the first eight bars of "Giant Steps" use a shortened version that does not return to I, and in "Countdown" the progression begins on ii^{7} each time). The standard substitution can be found in several Coltrane compositions and arrangements recorded around this time, including "26-2" (a reharmonization of Charlie Parker's "Confirmation"), "Satellite" (based on the standard "How High the Moon"), "Exotica" (loosely based on the harmonic form of "I Can't Get Started"), Coltrane's arrangement of "But Not for Me", and the bridge of his arrangement of "Body and Soul".

In "Fifth House" (based on "Hot House", i.e. "What Is This Thing Called Love?") the standard substitution is implied over an ostinato bass pattern with no chordal instrument instructed to play the chord changes. When Coltrane's improvisation superimposes this progression over the ostinato bass, it is easy to hear how he used this concept for his freer playing in later years.

== See also ==
- Tritone substitution
- Circle of thirds
