= Outside (jazz) =

Improvisational approach

In jazz improvisation, outside playing describes approaches where one plays over a scale, mode or chord that is harmonically distant from the given chord. There are several common techniques to playing outside, that include side-stepping or side-slipping, superimposition of Coltrane changes, and polytonality.

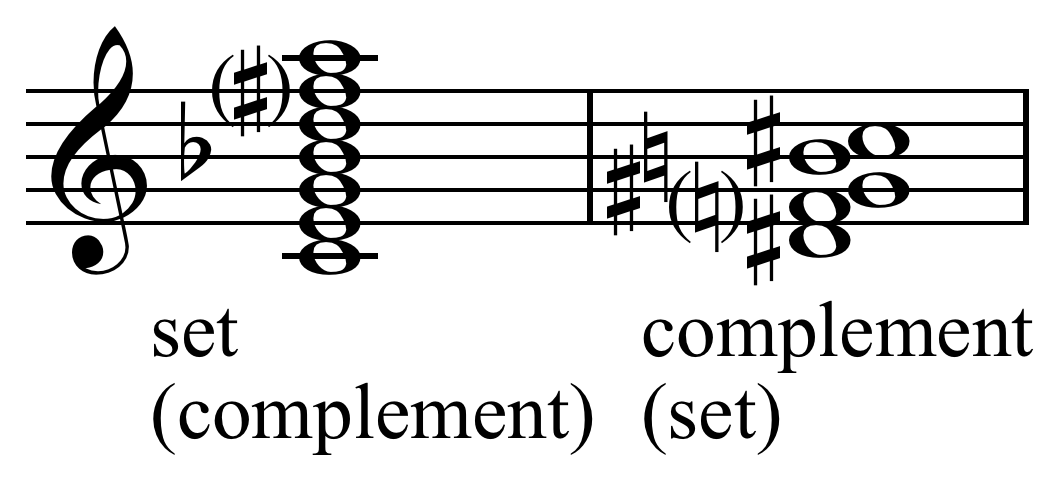
Side-slipping complementation: C7 chord/Lydian dominant scale (chord-scale system) and complement.

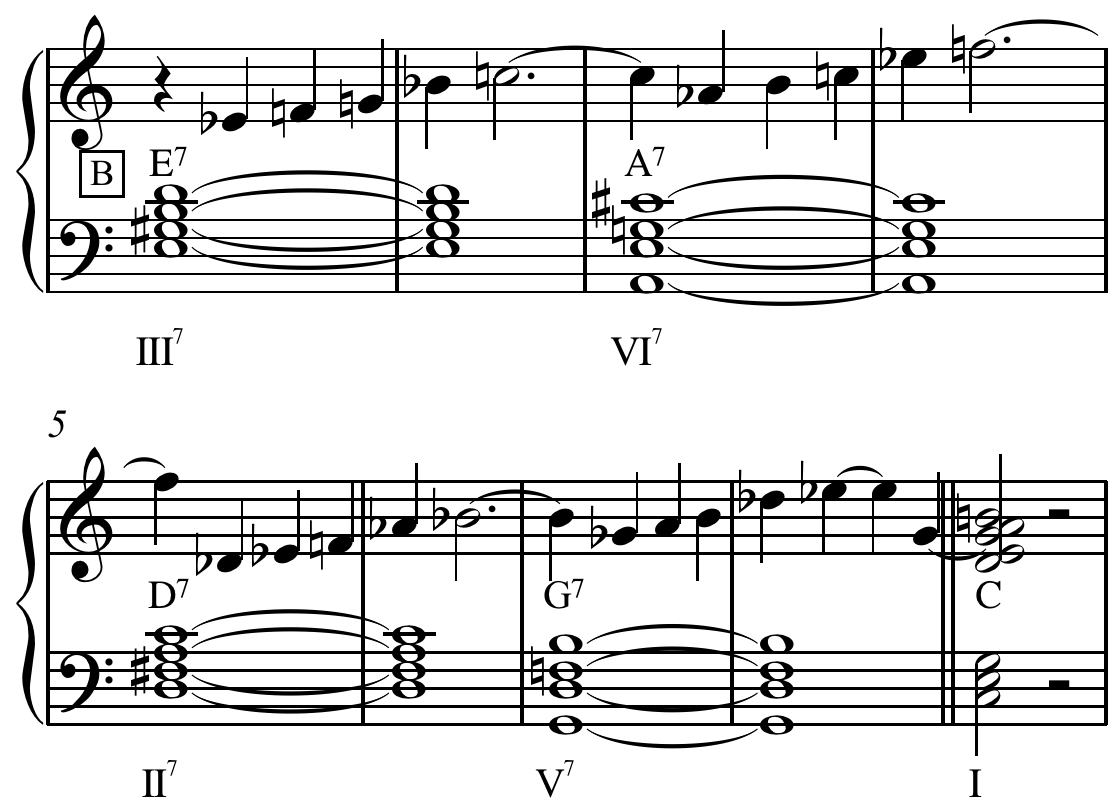
Side-slipping on rhythm changes B section, written for a B-flat instrument.

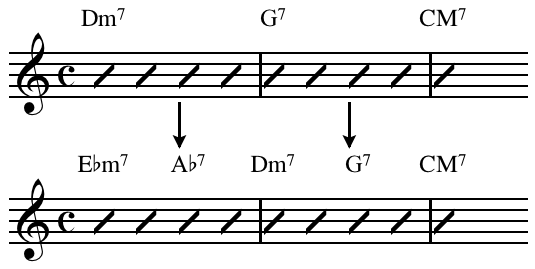
Side-slipping through distant ii–V.

The term outside is commonly used by jazz musicians playing in a post-bop idiom, but despite its frequent use in musicians’ jargon there is no set or standardized definition for it. As the term is commonly understood, outside is not a direct synonym to terms such as free improvisation, polytonality or atonality but a musical phenomenon in its own right. Also, outside concerns tonal tension; it does not involve breaking rhythmic, timbral or stylistic boundaries. Certain performance characteristics are as central in outside playing as they are in jazz improvisation in general: playing with good sound; with rhythmic drive and stability; and with confidence and conviction.

== Side-slipping ==
The term side-slipping or side-stepping has been used to describe several similar yet distinct methods of playing outside. In one version, one plays only the five "'wrong'" non-scale notes for the given chord and none of the seven scale or three to four chord tones, given that there are twelve notes in the equal tempered scale and heptatonic scales are generally used. Another technique described as sideslipping is the addition of distant ii–V relationships, such as a half-step above the original ii–V. This increases chromatic tension as it first moves away and then towards the tonic. Lastly, side-slipping can be described as playing in a scale a half-step above or below a given chord, before resolving, creating tension and release.

== See also ==
- Bar-line shift
- Coltrane changes
- Polytonality
- Nonchord tone
