= Augmented third =

- Inverse: diminished sixth

Name
- Other names: -
- Abbreviation: A3

Size
- Semitones: 5
- Interval class: 5
- Just interval: 125:96, 21:16, 64:49

Cents
- Equal temperament: 500
- 24-Tone equal temperament: 500
- Just intonation: 457

In classical music from Western culture, an augmented third is an interval of five semitones. It may be produced by widening a major third by a chromatic semitone. For instance, the interval from C to E is a major third, four semitones wide, and both the intervals from C♭ to E, and from C to E♯ are augmented thirds, spanning five semitones.

Being augmented, it is considered a dissonant interval.

Its inversion is the diminished sixth, and its enharmonic equivalent is the perfect fourth.

The just augmented third, E♯, is 456.99 cents or 125:96. The Pythagorean augmented third, E♯+++, is 521.51 cents or 177147:131072, eleven just perfect fifths.
