= V–IV–I turnaround =

Cadential Pattern

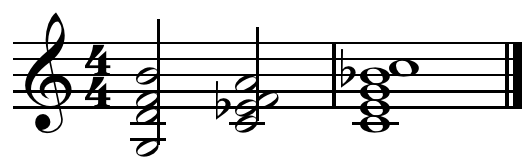
V–IV–I progression in C

In music, the V–IV–I turnaround, or blues turnaround, is one of several cadential patterns traditionally found in the twelve-bar blues, and commonly found in rock and roll.

The cadence moves from the tonic to dominant, to subdominant, and back to the tonic. "In a blues in A, the turnaround will consist of the chords E^{7}, D^{7}, A^{7}, E^{7} [V–IV–I–V]." V may be used in the last measure rather than I since, "nearly all blues tunes have more than one chorus (occurrence of the 12-bar progression), the turnaround (last four bars) usually ends on V, which makes us feel like we need to hear I again, thus bringing us around to the top (beginning) of the form again.".

== History ==
"It seems likely that the blues turnaround evolved from ragtime-type music", the earliest example being I–I^{7}–IV–iv–I (in C: C–C^{7}–F–Fm–C), "The Japanese Grand March". This is a plagal cadence featuring a dominant seventh tonic (I or V/IV) chord. However, Baker cites a turnaround containing "How Dry I Am" as the "absolutely most commonly used blues turnaround". Fischer describes the turnaround as the last two measures of the blues form, or I^{7} and V^{7}, with variations including I^{7}–IV^{7}–I^{7}–V^{7}.

== Analysis ==
The root movement of the V−IV−I cadential formula found in the blues is considered nontraditional from the standpoint of Western harmony. The motion of the V−IV−I cadence has been considered "backward," as, in traditional harmony, the subdominant normally prepares for the dominant which then has a strong tendency to resolve to the tonic. However, an alternative analysis has been proposed in which the IV acts to intensify the seventh of V, which is then resolved to the third of the tonic.

The V–IV–I movement has also been characterized as "unwinding" the V–I cadence with the addition of the passing IV.

== Variations ==
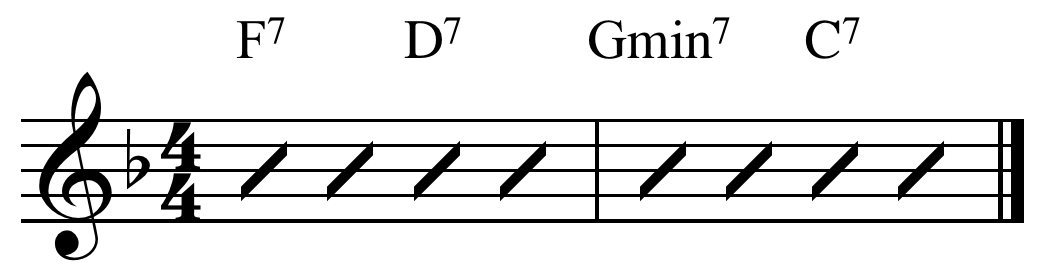
"The stock jazz-blues turnaround [I^{7}–VI^{7}–ii^{7}–V^{7}]. More specifically the I–VI–ii–V^{7} turnaround that can be found in jazz and many non-jazz styles. If there is one turnaround...that has to become second nature, this is it.".

The blues turnaround may be "dress[ed] up" by using V aug ("an uptown V^{7}") instead of V^{7}, "adding a touch of jazzy sophistication." An important variation is the jazz influenced turnaround ii–V–I–V.

== See also ==
- Mixolydian mode
- Dorian mode
- Blues scale
