= Major third =

Musical interval

- Inverse: Minor sixth

Name
- Other names: ditone
- Abbreviation: M3

Tuning
- 12 equal temperament: 4 semitones (400 cents)
- Pythagorean tuning: 81:64 (~407.82 cents)
- 5-limit tuning: 5:4 (~386.31 cents)
- 7-limit tuning: 9:7 (~435.08 cents)

In music theory, a third is a musical interval encompassing three staff positions (see Interval number for more details), and the major third is a third spanning four half steps or two whole steps. Along with the minor third, the major third is one of two commonly occurring thirds. It is described as major because it is the larger interval of the two: The major third spans four semitones, whereas the minor third only spans three. For example, the interval from C to E is a major third, as the note E lies four semitones above C, and there are three staff positions from C to E.

As Beward and Saker explain:

The intervals from the tonic (keynote) in an upward direction to the second, to the third, to the sixth, and to the seventh scale degrees of a major scale are called "major".

Diminished and augmented thirds are shown on the musical staff the same number of lines and spaces apart, but contain a different number of semitones in pitch (two and five).

== Harmonic and non-harmonic thirds ==
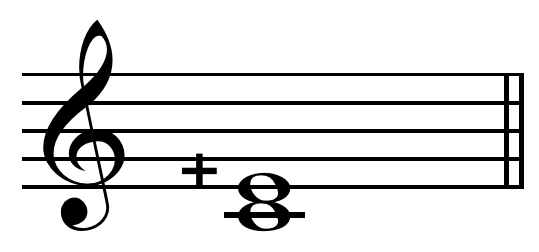
Pythagorean major third, i.e. a ditone

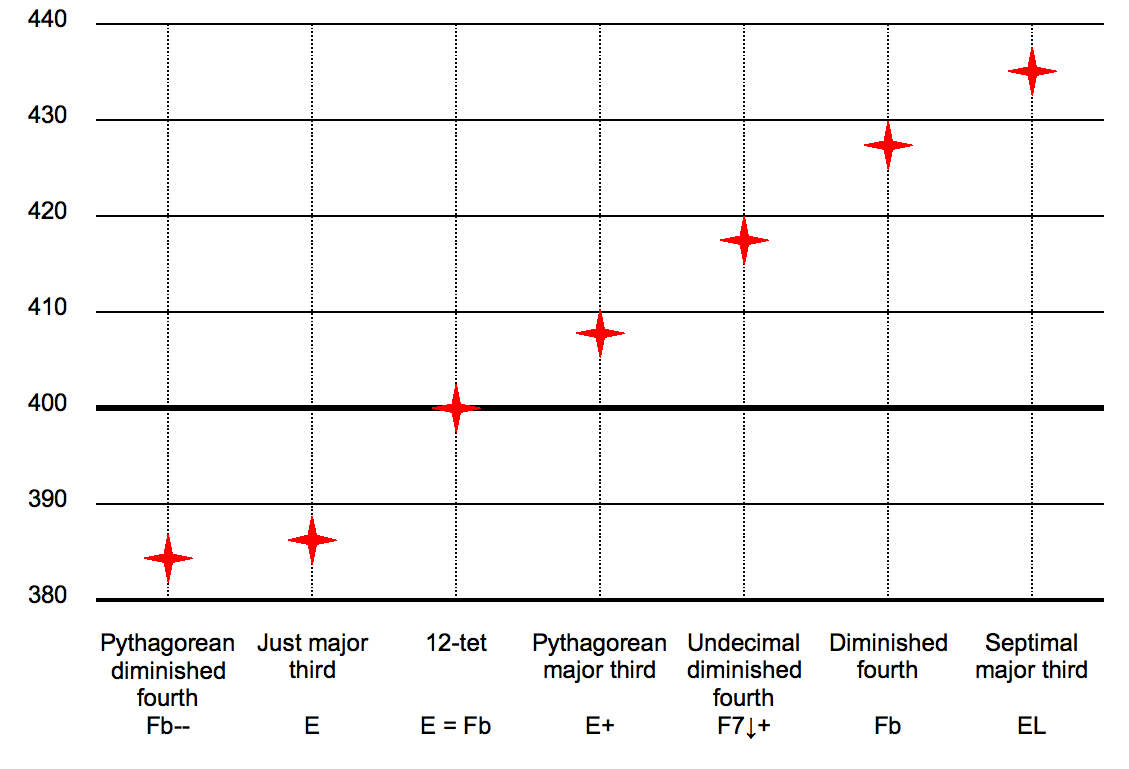
Comparison, in cents, of intervals at or near a major third

The major third may be derived from the harmonic series as the interval between the fourth and fifth harmonics. The major scale is so named because of the presence of this interval between its tonic and mediant (1st and 3rd) scale degrees. The major chord also takes its name from the presence of this interval built on the chord's root (provided that the interval of a perfect fifth from the root is also present).

A major third is slightly different in different musical tunings: In just intonation it corresponds to a pitch ratio of 5:4, or 5 / 4 (fifth harmonic in relation to the fourth) or 386.31 cents; in 12 tone equal temperament, a major third is equal to four semitones, a ratio of 2^{1/3}:1 (about 1.2599) or 400 cents, 13.69 cents wider than the 5:4 ratio. The older concept of a "ditone" (two 9:8 major seconds) made a dissonant, wide major third with the ratio 81:64 (about 1.2656) or 408 cents, about 22 cents sharp from the harmonic ratio of 5:4 . The septimal major third is 9:7 (435 cents), the undecimal major third is 14:11 (418 cents), and the tridecimal major third is 13:10 (452 cents).

In 12 tone equal temperament (12 TET) three major thirds in a row are equal to an octave. For example, A^{♭} to C, C to E, and E to G^{♯} (in 12 TET, the differently written notes G^{♯} and A^{♭} both represent the same pitch, but not in most other tuning systems). This is sometimes called the "circle of thirds". In just intonation, however, three 5:4 major third, the 125th subharmonic, is less than an octave. For example, three 5:4 major thirds from C is B^{♯} (C to E, to G^{♯}, to B^{♯}) ( B^{♯} / C $= \tfrac{\; 5^3 \ }{\; 2^6\ } = \tfrac{\ 125\ }{ 64 }\$). The difference between this just-tuned B^{♯} and C, like the interval between G^{♯} and A^{♭}, is called the "enharmonic diesis", about 41 cents, or about two commas (the inversion of the interval 125 / 64 : $\ \frac{\ 128\ }{ 125 } = \frac{\; 2^7\ }{\; 5^3 }\$).

== Consonance vs. dissonance ==
The major third is classed as an imperfect consonance and is considered one of the most consonant intervals after the unison, octave, perfect fifth, and perfect fourth. In the common practice period, thirds were considered interesting and dynamic consonances along with their inverses the sixths, but in medieval times they were considered dissonances unusable in a stable final sonority.

In equal temperament, a diminished fourth is enharmonically equivalent to a major third (that is, it spans the same number of semitones). For example, B–D^{♯} is a major third; but if the same pitches are spelled as the notes B and E^{♭}, then the interval they represent is instead a diminished fourth. The difference in pitch is erased in 12 tone equal temperament, where the distinction is only nominal, but the difference between a major third and a diminished fourth is significant in almost all other musical tuning systems. B–E^{♭} occurs in the C harmonic minor scale.

The major third is used in guitar tunings. For the standard tuning, only the interval between the 3rd and 2nd strings (G to B, respectively) is a major third; each of the intervals between the other pairs of consecutive strings is a perfect fourth. In an alternative tuning, the major-thirds tuning, each of the intervals are major thirds.

== Interval sounds ==
- Minor thirds:

C-E^{♭}
Strings playing the note C then E^{♭}

C-A
Strings playing the note C then A

- Major thirds

Major third (equal temperament)
The file plays middle C, followed by E (a tone 400 cents sharper than C), followed by both tones together.

C-E
Strings playing the note C then E

C-A^{♭}
Strings playing the note C then A^{♭}

== See also ==
- Ear training
- Ladder of thirds / chain of thirds
- List of meantone intervals
- Circle of thirds
