= Borrowed chord =

Chord borrowed from the parallel key

Borrowed chord (vii^{o}^{4}_{3} = F–A♭–B–D) in J.S. Bach's Prelude No. 1 in C major from The Well-Tempered Clavier

A borrowed chord (also called chord borrowing, mode mixture, modal mixture, substituted chord, modal interchange, or mutation) is a chord borrowed from the parallel key (minor or major scale with the same tonic). Borrowed chords are typically used as "color chords", providing harmonic variety through contrasting scale forms, which are major scales and the three forms of minor scales. Chords may also be borrowed from other parallel modes besides the major and minor mode, for example D Dorian with D major. The mixing of the major and minor modes developed in the Baroque period.

Borrowed chords are distinguished from modulation by being brief enough that the tonic is not lost or displaced, and may be considered brief or transitory modulations and may be distinguished from secondary chords as well as altered chords. According to Sheila Romeo, "[t]he borrowed chord suggests the sound of its own mode without actually switching to that mode."

== Common borrowed chords ==
Borrowed chord (vii^{o}^{4}_{3} = G♯–B–D–F♮) in Mozart's Piano Sonata No. 18, mvmt. II

Sheila Romeo explains that "[i]n theory, any chord from any mode of the scale of the piece is a potential modal interchange or borrowed chord. Some are used more frequently than others, while some almost never occur."

In the minor mode, a common borrowed chord from the parallel major key is the Picardy third.

In the major mode, the most common examples of borrowed chords are those involving the ♭, also known as the lowered sixth scale degree. These chords are shown below, in the key of C major.

- vii^{o}^{7}: B–D–F–A♭
- ii^{o}: D–F–A♭
- ii^{ø}^{7}: D–F–A♭–C
- iv: F–A♭–C

The next most common involve the ♭ and ♭. These chords are shown below.

- i: C–E♭–G
- ♭VI: A♭–C–E♭
- iv^{7}: F–A♭–C–E♭
- ♭III: E♭–G–B♭
- ♭VII: B♭–D–F

I–♭VII–♭VI–♭VII in C
Backdoor progression in C. ♭VII^{7} is borrowed from the parallel minor rather than Mixolydian as ♭VII may be.

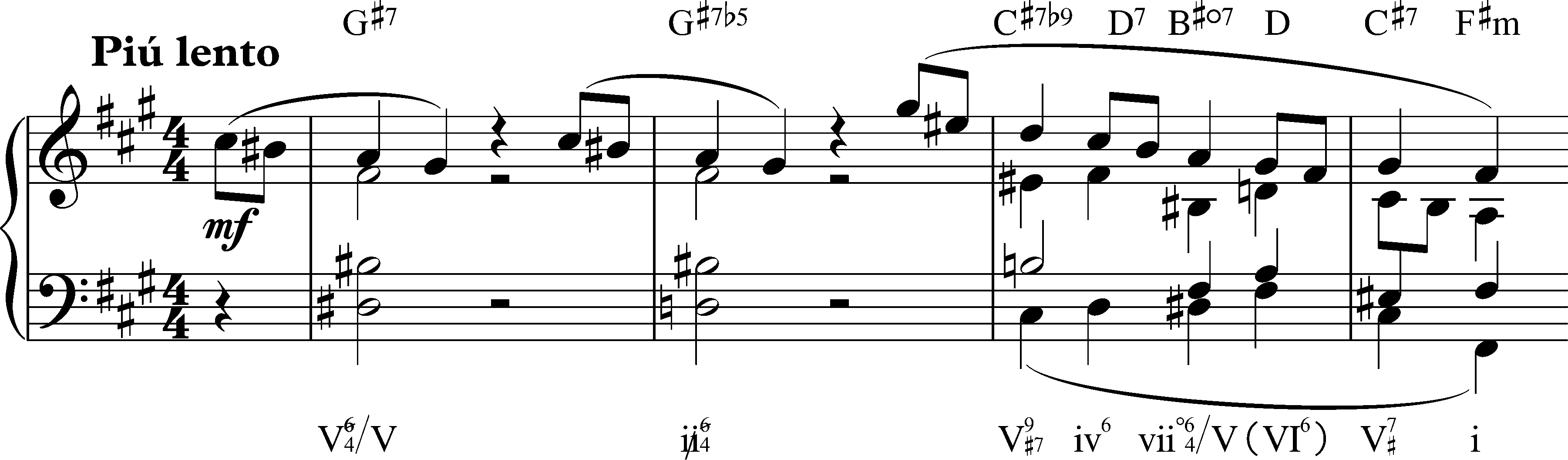
Phrase from César Franck's Variations symphoniques (1885), with chromaticism from use of borrowed chords and descending linear motion and, "resolute movement from V of V to V to I."

Chord progressions may be constructed with borrowed chords, including two progressions common in rock music, I–♭VII–♭VI–♭VII, common everywhere, and I–♭VI–IV, used by bands like Genesis, Yes, and Nirvana. ♭VII is from Mixolydian and ♭VI is found in both Aeolian and Phrygian. The ♭VII–I cadence with ♭VII substituting for V is common, as well as ♭II–I, ♭III–I, and ♭VI–I. In popular music, the major triads on the lowered third (♭III), sixth (♭VI) and seventh (♭VII) scale degrees are common.

Borrowed chords have typical inversions or common positions, for example ii^{o}^{6} and ii^{ø}^{6}_{5}, and progress in the same manner as the diatonic chords they replace except for ♭VI, which progresses to V^{(7)}.

== Chords list ==
Major and minor triads on all 12 roots, with the mode each is borrowed from.

Chord	Numeral	Borrowed from
C	I	Ionian
Cm	i	Aeolian
D♭	♭II	Phrygian
D♭m	♭ii	none (chromatic)
D	II	Lydian (V/V)
Dm	ii	Ionian
E♭	♭III	Aeolian
E♭m	♭iii	none (chromatic)
E	III	none (chromatic, V/vi)
Em	iii	Ionian
F	IV	Ionian
Fm	iv	Aeolian
G♭	♭V	none (chromatic)
G♭m	♭v	none (chromatic)
G	V	Ionian
Gm	v	Mixolydian
A♭	♭VI	Aeolian
A♭m	♭vi	none (chromatic)
A	VI	none (chromatic, V/ii)
Am	vi	Ionian
B♭	♭VII	Mixolydian
B♭m	♭vii	Phrygian
B	VII	none (chromatic, V/iii)
Bm	vii	Lydian

== See also ==
- Aeolian harmony – Musical mode
- Diatonic function – Musical term
- Harmonic major – Musical scale
