= Chord substitution =

Technique of using a chord in place of another in a progression of chords

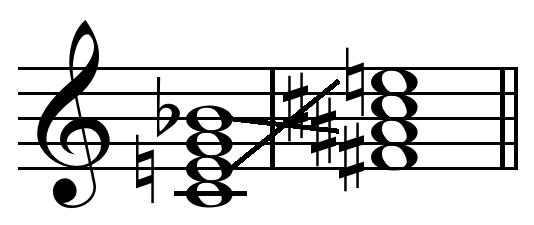
Tritone substitution: F♯7 may substitute for C7, and vice versa, because they both share E♮ and B♭/A♯ and due to voice leading considerations.

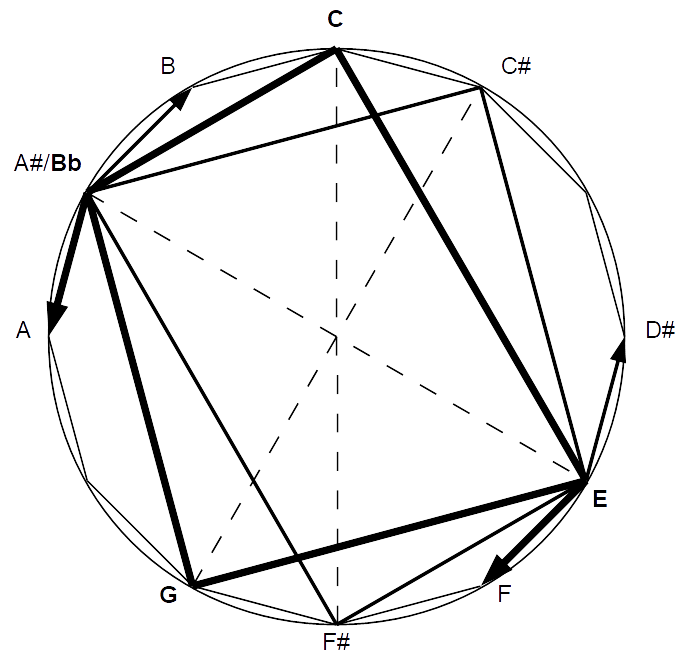
C7 is transpositionally equivalent to F♯7, the leading tones resolve inversionally (E–B♭ resolves to F–A, A♯–E resolves to B–D♯)

F–C7–F, F–F♯7–F, B–F♯7–B, then B–C7–B

In music theory, chord substitution is the technique of using a chord in place of another in a progression of chords, or a chord progression. Much of the European classical repertoire and the vast majority of blues, jazz and rock music songs are based on chord progressions. "A chord substitution occurs when a chord is replaced by another that is made to function like the original. Usually substituted chords possess two pitches in common with the triad that they are replacing."

== Use in classical music ==
In J. S. Bach's St Matthew Passion, the chorale "Herzliebster Jesu" makes its first appearance in a straightforward harmonisation:

Bach, St Matthew Passion, No. 3, Chorale "Herzliebster Jesu"

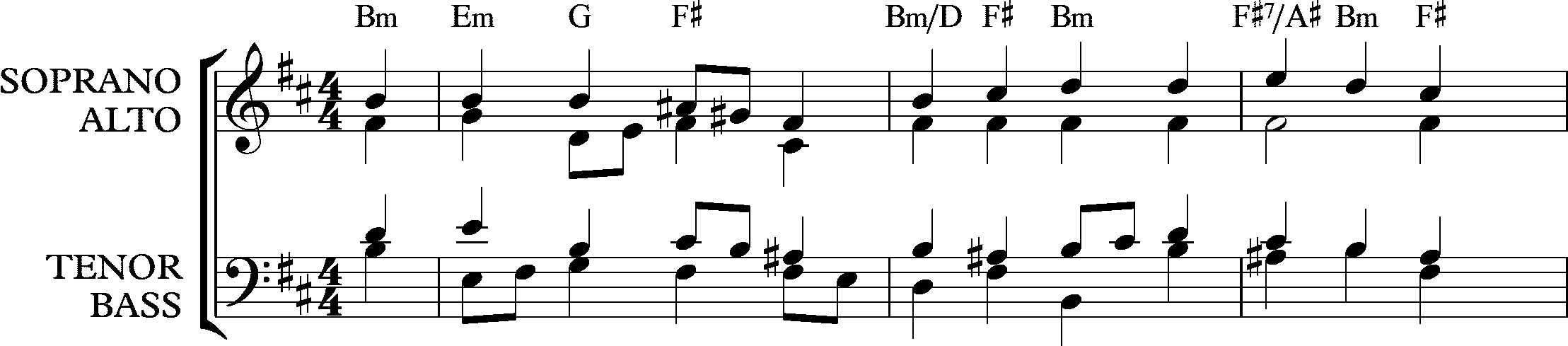
Bach, St Matthew Passion, No. 3, Chorale "Herzliebster Jesu"

Later, as the Passion Story draws towards its sombre conclusion, we find "a more chromatic and emotional setting of the melody" that passes through "no less than ten chords with grinding chromatic steps in the bass":

Bach, St Matthew Passion, No 46, Chorale "Herzliebster Jesu" different harmonization

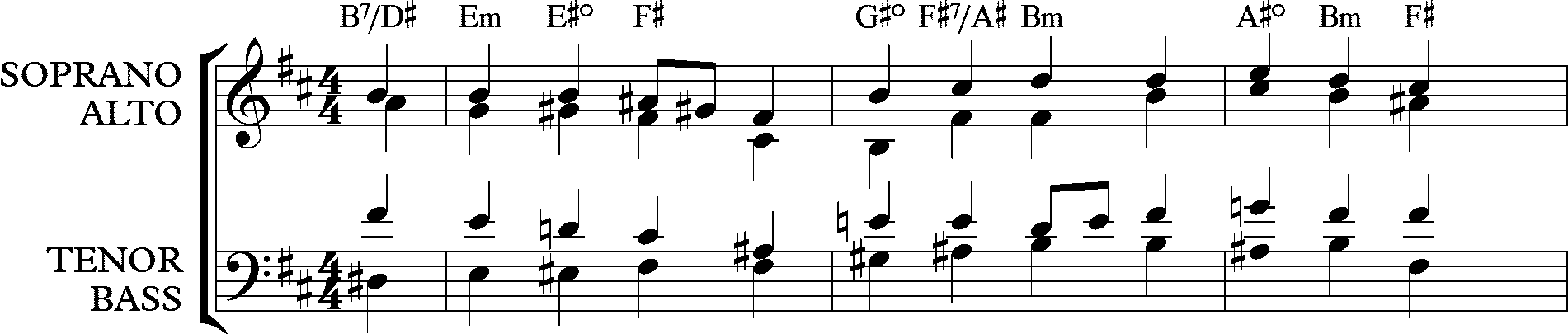
Bach, St Matthew Passion, No. 46, Chorale "Herzliebster Jesu" different harmonization

The well-known theme of the second movement of Joseph Haydn's String Quartet, Op. 76 No. 3 is harmonized simply at the start:

Haydn, String Quartet Op. 76, No. 3, second movement, bars 1–2

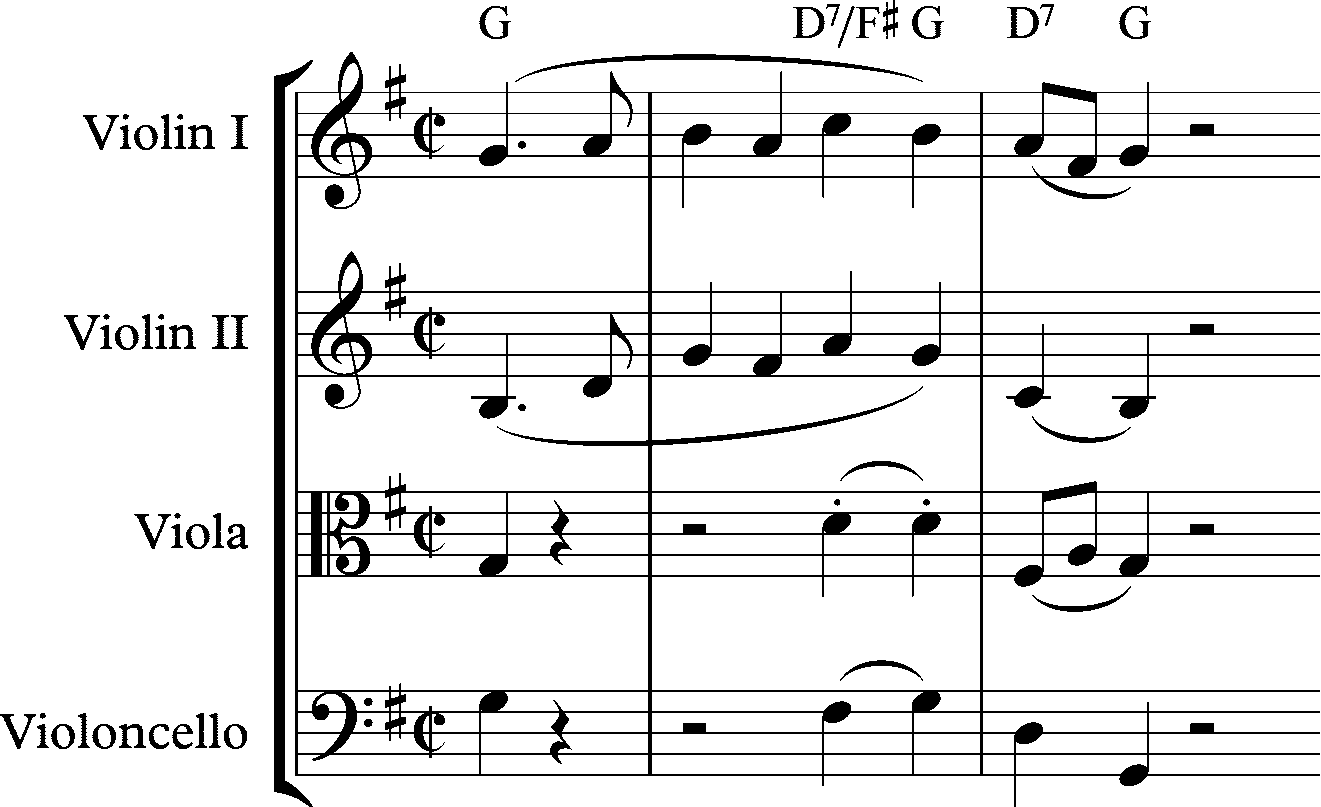
Haydn, String Quartet Op. 76, No. 3, second movement, bars 1–2

Haydn later "reharmonizes the theme". Hans Keller calls this "the fullest and richest statement" of the famous melody: "In the second bar, for instance, there is even a turn to the relative minor":

Haydn, String Quartet Op. 76, No. 3, second movement, bars 80–81

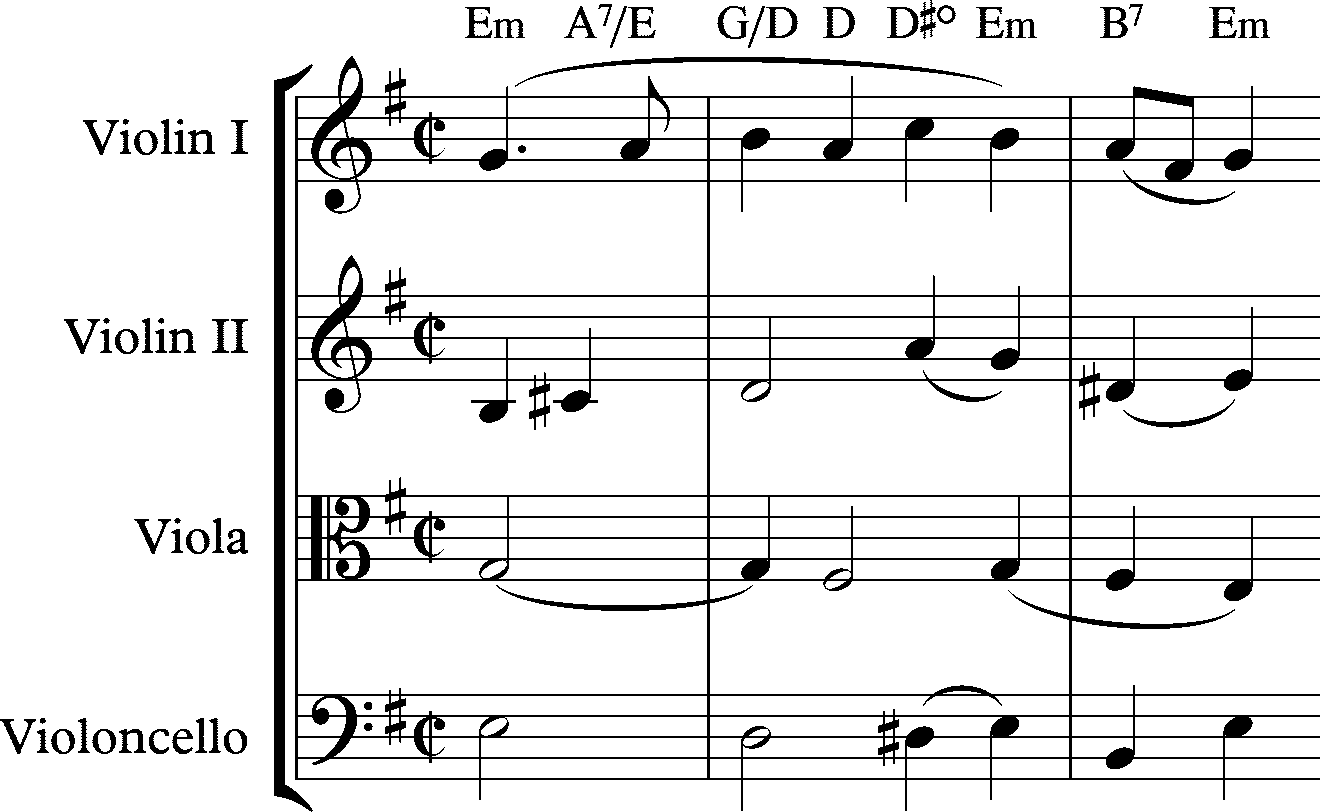
Haydn, String Quartet Op. 76, No. 3, second movement, bars 80–81

Diminished triad substituting for dominant chord in J. S. Bach's Well-Tempered Clavier I, Prelude in G major.

The diminished triad can be used to substitute for the dominant seventh chord. In major scales, a diminished triad occurs only on the seventh scale degree. For instance, in the key of C, this is a B diminished triad (B, D, F). Since the triad is built on the seventh scale degree, it is also called the leading-tone triad. This chord has a dominant function. Unlike the dominant triad or dominant seventh, the leading-tone triad functions as a prolongational chord rather than a structural chord since the strong root motion by fifth is absent.

== Use in blues, jazz and rock music ==
Jazz musicians often substitute chords in the original progression to create variety and add interest to a piece.

The substitute chord must have some harmonic quality and degree of function in common with the original chord, and often only differs by one or two notes. Scott DeVeaux describes a "penchant in modern jazz for harmonic substitution."

One simple type of chord substitution is to replace a given chord with a chord that has the same function. Thus, in the simple chord progression I–ii–V–I, which in the key of C major would be the chords C Major–D minor–G Major–C Major, a musician could replace the I chords with "tonic substitutes". The most widely used substitutes are iii and vi (in a Major key), which in this case would be the chords "E minor" and "A minor".

This simple chord progression with tonic substitutes could become iii–ii–V–vi or, with chord names, "E minor–D minor–G Major–A minor". Given the overlap in notes between the original tonic chords and the chord substitutes (for example, C major is the notes "C, E, and G", and "E minor" is the notes "E, G and B"), the melody is likely to be supported by the new chords. The musician typically applies a sense of the musical style and harmonic suitability to determine if the chord substitution works with the melody.

There are also subdominant substitutes and dominant substitutes. For subdominant chords, in the key of C major, in the chord progression C major/F major/G7/C major (a simple I /IV/V7/I progression), the notes of the subdominant chord, F major, are "F, A, and C". As such, a performer or arranger who wished to add variety to the song could try using a chord substitution for a repetition of this progression. One simple chord substitute for IV is the "ii" chord, a minor chord built on the second scale degree. In the key of C major, the "ii" chord is "D minor", which is the notes "D, F, and A". As there are two shared notes between the IV and "ii" chords, a melody that works well over IV is likely to be supported by the "ii" chord.

== Types ==
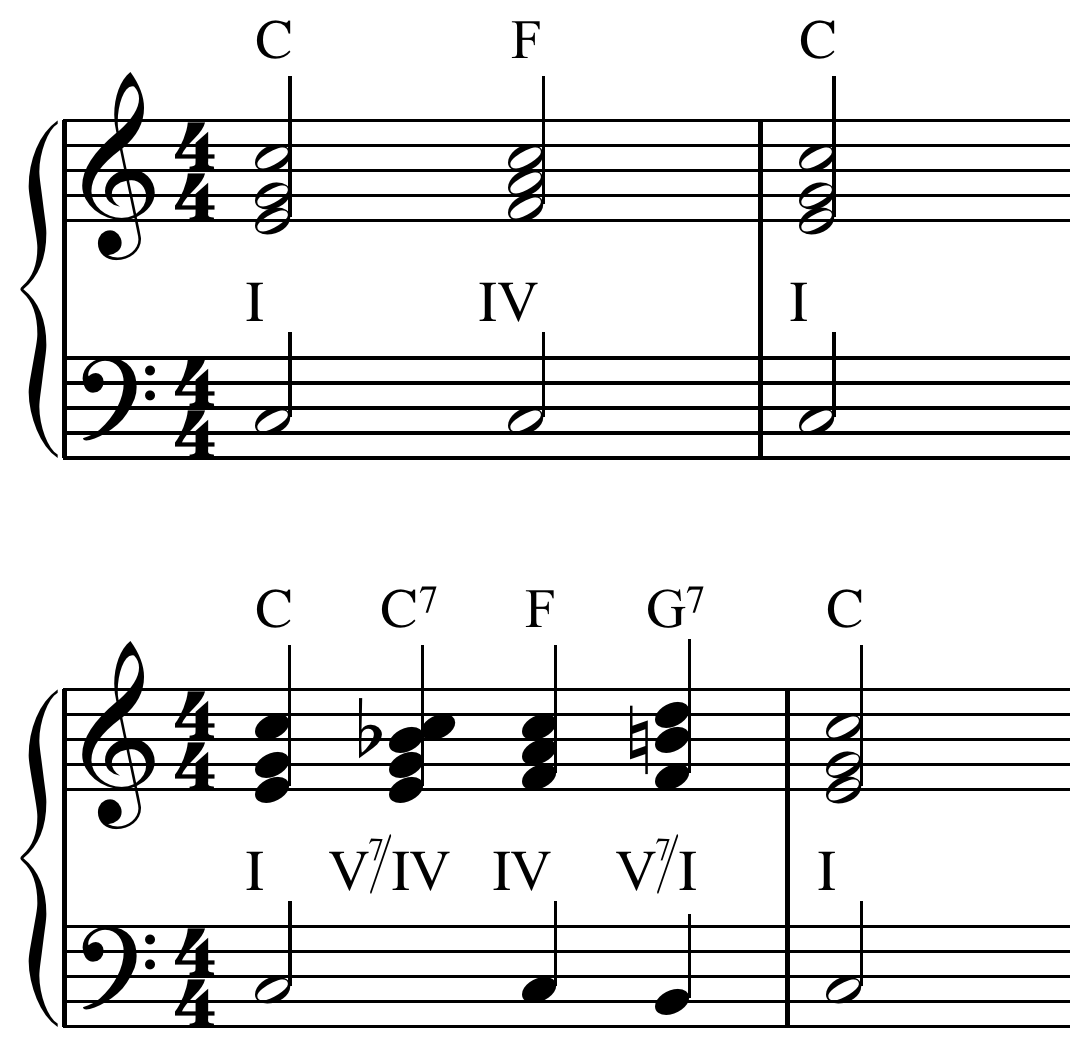
Final two chords in the first progression are each preceded by their dominants in the second progression

The ii–V substitution is when a chord or each chord in a progression is preceded by its supertonic (ii7) and dominant (V7), or simply its dominant. For example, a C major chord would be preceded by Dm7 and G7. Since secondary dominant chords are often inserted between the chords of a progression rather than replacing one, this may be considered as 'addition' rather than 'substitution'.

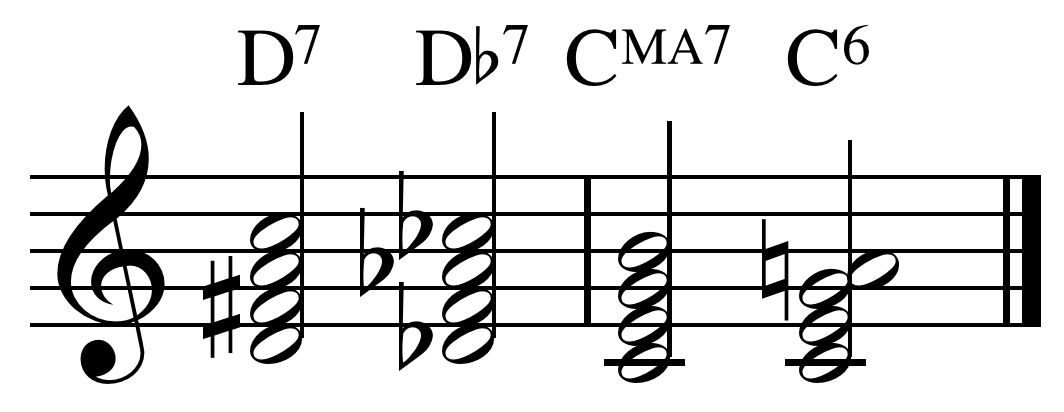
ii7–subV7–IM7–I6 progression

Chord quality alteration is when the quality of a chord is changed, and the new chord of similar root and construction, but with one pitch different, is substituted for the original chord, for example the minor sixth for the major seventh, or the major seventh for the minor.

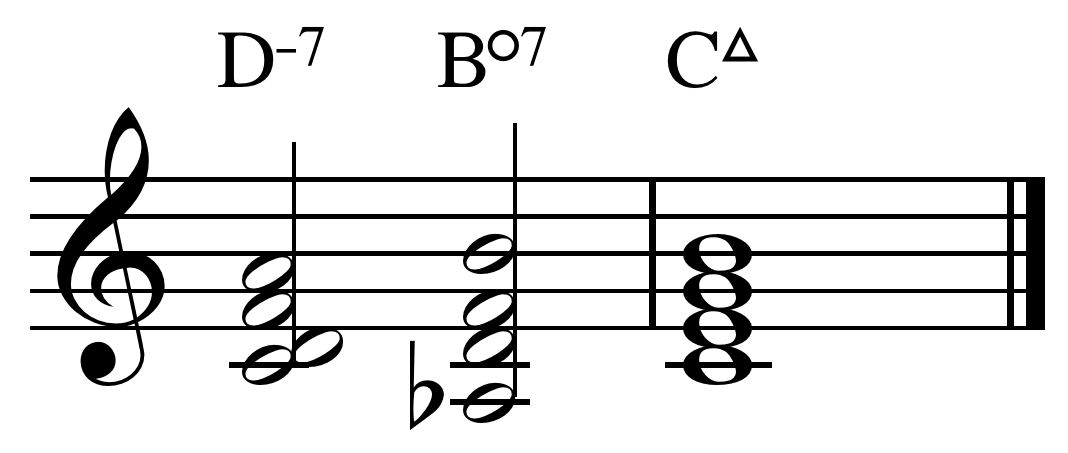
vii^{o}^{7} as dominant substitute

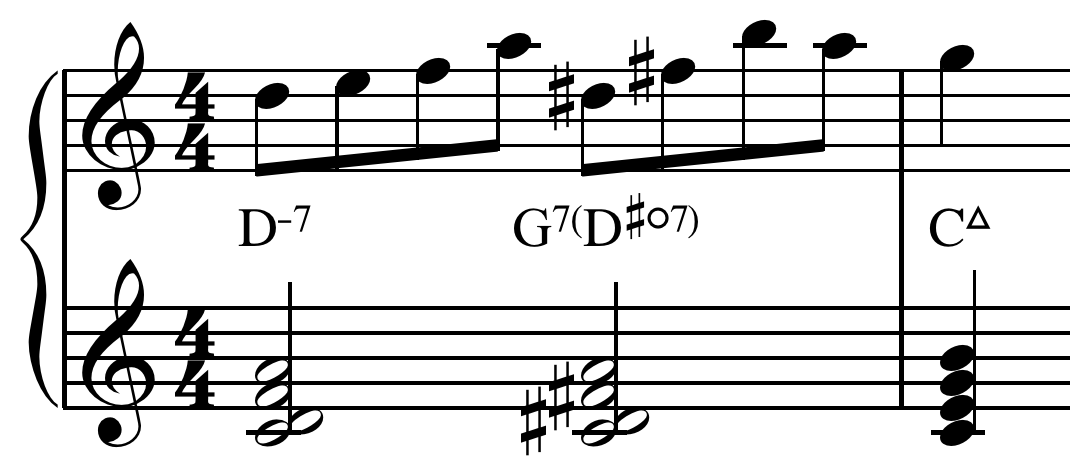
♯II^{o}^{7} as dominant substitute

The diminished seventh chord is often used in place of a dominant 7th chord. In the key of A Major the V chord, E dominant 7th (which is made up of the notes E, G♯, B, and D) can be replaced with a G♯ diminished seventh chord (G♯, B, D, F). If the diminished seventh chord (G♯) is followed by the I chord (A), this creates chromatic (stepwise semitonal) root movement, which can add musical interest in a song mainly constructed around the interval of the fourth or fifth. The diminished seventh chord on the sharpened second scale degree, ♯II^{o}^{7}, may be used as a substitute dominant, for example in C: ♯II^{o}^{7} = D♯–F♯–A–C♮ ↔ B–D♯–F♯–A = VII^{7}.

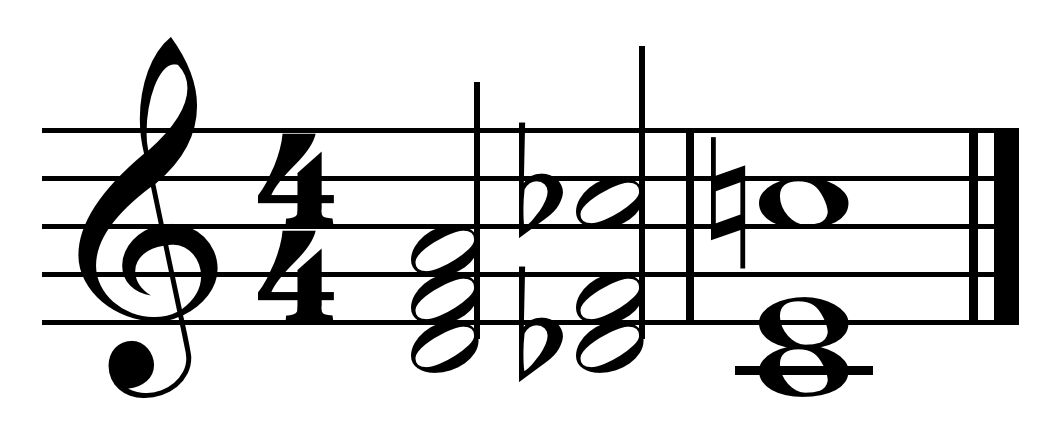
The tritone substitution ii–subV–I in C creates the chromatic root movement D–D♭–C.

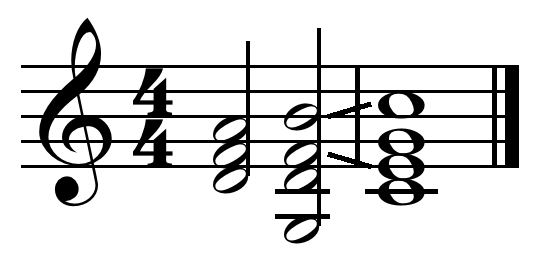
Contrast with the original ii–V–I progression in C, which creates the leading-tone B–C.

In a tritone substitution, the substitute chord only differs slightly from the original chord. If the original chord in a song is G7 (G, B, D, F), the tritone substitution would be D♭7 (D♭, F, A♭, C♭). Note that the 3rd and 7th notes of the G7 chord are found in the D♭7 chord (albeit with a change of role). The tritone substitution is widely used for V7 chords in the popular jazz chord progression "ii-V-I". In the key of C, this progression is "d minor, G7, C Major". With tritone substitution, this progression would become "d minor, D♭7, C Major," which contains chromatic root movement. When performed by the bass player, this chromatic root movement creates a smooth-sounding progression. "Tritone substitutions and altered dominants are nearly identical...Good improvisers will liberally sprinkle their solos with both devices. A simple comparison of the notes generally used with the given chord [notation] and the notes used in tri-tone substitution or altered dominants will reveal a rather stunning contrast, and could cause the unknowledgeable analyzer to suspect errors. ...(the distinction between the two [tri-tone substitution and altered dominant] is usually a moot point).".

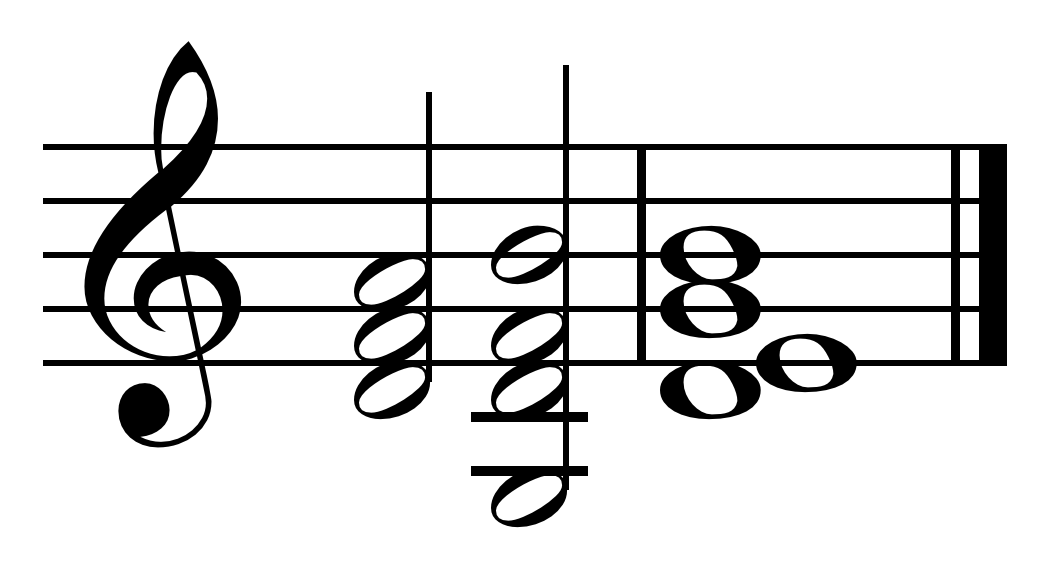
iii^{7} as tonic substitute

Tonic substitution is the use of chords that sound similar to the tonic chord (or I chord) in place of the tonic. In major keys, the chords iii and vi are often substituted for the I chord, to add interest. In the key of C major, the I major 7 chord is "C, E, G, B," the iii chord ("III–7") is E minor 7 ("E, G, B, D") and the vi minor 7 chord is A minor 7 ("A, C, E, G"). Both of the tonic substitute chords use notes from the tonic chord, which means that they usually support a melody originally designed for the tonic (I) chord.

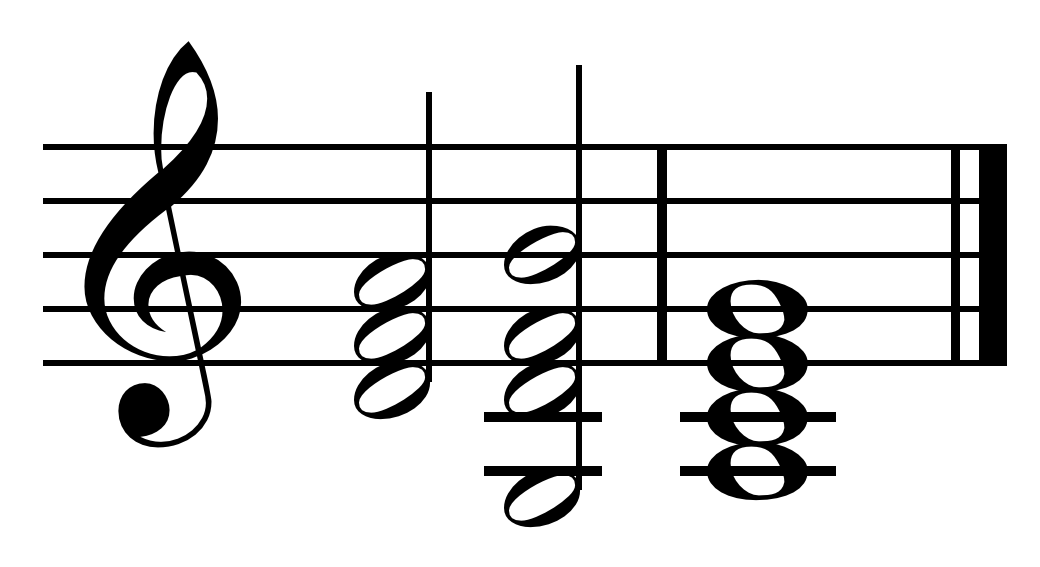
vi^{7} as tonic substitute

The relative major/minor substitution shares two common tones and is so called because it involves the relation between major and minor keys with the same key signatures, such as C major and A minor.

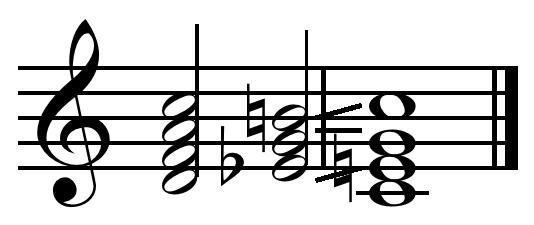
♭III^{+} as dominant substitute

The augmented triad on the fifth scale degree may be used as a substitute dominant, and may also be considered as ♭III^{+}, for example in C: V^{+} = G–B–D♯, ♭III^{+} = E♭–G–B♮, and since in every key: D♯ = E♭.

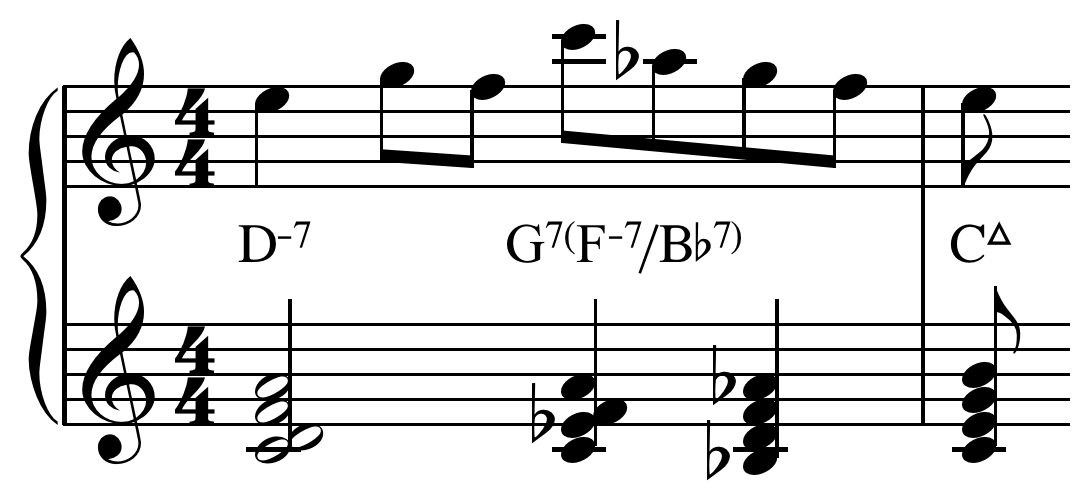
"Backdoor ii–V" in C: IV^{7}–♭VII^{7}–I. Chord symbols for the conventional ii–V progression are above the staff, with the chord symbols for the substitution in parentheses.

The chord a minor third above, ♭VII^{7}, may be substituted for the dominant, and may be preceded by its ii: iv^{7}. Due to common use the two chords of the backdoor progression (IV^{7}-♭VII^{7}) may be substituted for the dominant chord. In C major the dominant would be G7: GBDF, sharing two common tones with B♭7: B♭DFA♭. A♭ and F serve as upper leading-tones back to G and E, respectively, rather than B♮ and F serving as the lower and upper leading-tones to C and E.

== Application ==
In jazz, chord substitutions can be applied by composers, arrangers, or performers. Composers may use chord substitutions when they are basing a new jazz tune on an existing chord progression from an old jazz standard or a song from a musical; arrangers for a big band or jazz orchestra may use chord substitutions in their arrangement of a tune, to add harmonic interest or give a different "feel" to a song; and instrumentalists may use chord substitutions in their performance of a song. Given that many jazz songs have repetition of internal sections, such as with a 32-bar AABA song form, performers or arrangers may use chord substitution within the A sections to add variety to the song.

Jazz comping instruments (piano, guitar, organ, vibes) often use chord substitution to add harmonic interest to a jazz tune with slow harmonic change. For example, the jazz standard chord progression of "rhythm changes" uses a simple eight bar chord progression in the bridge with the chords III7, VI7, II7, V7; in the key of B♭, these chords are D7, G7, C7, and F7 (each for two bars). A jazz guitarist might add a ii–V7 aspect to each chord, which would make the progression: "a minor, D7, d minor, G7, g minor, C7, c minor, F7. Alternatively, tritone substitutions could be applied to the progression.

Note that both the back door progression and ♯II^{o}7, when substituted for V7, introduces notes that seem wrong or anachronistic to the V7 chord (such as the fourth and the major seventh). They work only because the given instances of those chords are familiar to the ear; hence when an improviser uses them against the V7, the listener's ear hears the given precedents for the event, instead of the conflict with the V7.

— Coker (1997), p. 82

Theoretically, any chord can substitute for any other chord, as long as the new chord supports the melody. In practice, though, only a few options sound musically and stylistically appropriate to a given melody. This technique is used in music such as bebop or fusion to provide more sophisticated harmony, or to create a new-sounding re-harmonization of an old jazz standard.

Jazz soloists and improvisers also use chord substitutions to help them add interest to their improvised solos. Jazz soloing instruments that can play chords, such as jazz guitar, piano, and organ players may use substitute chords to develop a chord solo over an existing jazz tune with slow-moving harmonies. Also, jazz improvisers may use chord substitution as a mental framework to help them create more interesting-sounding solos. For example, a saxophonist playing an improvised solo over the basic "rhythm changes" bridge (in B♭, this is "D7, G7, C7, and F7", each for two bars) might think of a more complex progression that uses substitute chords (e.g., "a minor, D7, d minor, G7, g minor, C7, c minor, F7). In doing so, this implies the substitute chords over the original progression, which adds interest for listeners.

== See also ==
- Coltrane changes
- Passing chord
