= Ii–V–I progression =

Common chord progression

ii–V–I progression (with seventh chords) in C major

The ii–V–I progression ("two–five–one", occasionally referred to as the ii–V–I turnaround) is a common cadential chord progression used in a wide variety of music genres, including jazz harmony. It is a succession of chords whose roots descend in fifths from the second degree (supertonic) to the fifth degree (dominant), and finally to the tonic. In a major key, the supertonic triad (ii) is minor, and in a minor key it is diminished. The dominant is, in its normal form, a major triad and commonly a dominant seventh chord. With the addition of chord alterations, substitutions, and extensions, limitless variations exist on this simple formula.

The ii–V–I progression is "a staple of virtually every type of [Western] popular music", including jazz, R&B, pop, rock, and country. Examples include "Honeysuckle Rose" (1928), which, "features several bars in which the harmony goes back and forth between the II and V chords before finally resolving on the I chord," "Satin Doll" (1953), and "If I Fell".

== Jazz ==
ii–V–I progressions are extremely common in jazz. They serve two primary functions, which are often intertwined: to temporarily imply passing tonalities and to lead strongly toward a goal (the "I" chord). One potential situation where ii–V–I progressions can be put to use is in blues, whose generic form has no such progressions. In the example below, a simple 12-bar F blues is shown followed by a similar one with some basic ii–V–I substitutions (in bold).

F^{7} (I)	B♭^{7} (IV)	F^{7} (I)	F^{7} (I)
B♭^{7} (IV)	B♭^{7} (IV)	F^{7} (I)	F^{7} (I)
C^{7} (V)	B♭^{7} (IV)	F^{7} (I)	C^{7} (V)

→

F^{7}	B♭^{7}	F^{7}	**Cm^{7} F^{7}**
B♭^{7}	B♭^{7}	F^{7}	**Am^{7} D^{7}**
**Gm^{7}**	**C^{7}**	F^{7}	**Gm^{7} C^{7}**

In bar 4, instead of the simple V–I root motion in the original blues, the ii chord of the B♭^{7} (Cm) is included so that the measure is even more directed toward the following downbeat with the B♭^{7}. In bars 8–10, instead of leading back to the tonic with the standard V–IV–I (blues cadence), a series of applied ii–V–I progressions is used to first lead to Gm, which then itself is reinterpreted as a ii and used to lead back to F^{7} through its own V, which is C^{7}. In the last bar (the "turnaround"), the same type of substitution is used as that in bar 4. In practice, musicians often extend the basic chords shown here, especially to 7ths, 9ths, and 13ths, as seen in this example:

iim^{9} V^{♯9♭13} I^{maj9}

In jazz, the ii is typically played as a minor 7th chord, and the I is typically played as a major 7th chord (though it can also be played as a major 6th chord). The iim^{7}–V^{7}–I^{maj7} progression provides smooth voice leading between the thirds and sevenths of these chords; the third of one chord becomes the seventh of the next chord, and the seventh of one chord moves down a half-step to become the third of the next chord. For example, in the key of C, the standard jazz ii–V–I progression is Dm^{7}–G^{7}–C^{maj7}, and the thirds and sevenths of these chords are F–C, B–F, E–B; inverted for smoother voice leading, these become F–C, F–B, E–B.

The ii is sometimes replaced by the II^{7}, giving it a more dissonant, bluesy feel; this is especially common in turnarounds. Additionally, the ii can be treated like a temporary minor tonic, and preceded by its own "ii–V", extending the basic progression to a iii–VI–ii–V–I; again, this is quite common in turnarounds (with the iii–VI replacing the I in the second-to-last bar; in the example above, the last two bars would change from F^{7} | Gm–C^{7} to Am–D^{7} | Gm–C^{7}).

The ii–V^{7}–I can be further modified by applying a tritone substitution to the V^{7} chord, replacing it with the ♭II^{7} chord. This is possible because the ♭II^{7} has the same third and seventh as the V^{7}, but inverted; for example, the third and seventh of G^{7} are B and F, while the third and seventh of D♭^{7} are F and C♭, which is enharmonic to B. Performing this substitution (in this case, changing Dm^{7}–G^{7}–C^{maj7} to Dm^{7}–D♭^{7}–C^{maj7}) creates smooth chromatic movement in the chord roots—the root of the ii (D) moves down a half-step to become the root of the ♭II7 (D♭), which moves down another half-step to become the root of the I (C).

The tritone substitution, the substitution of ♭II^{7} for V^{7}, and the III–VI–II–V extension can be combined in different permutations to produce many different variations on the same basic progression—e.g. iii^{7}–♭III^{7}–iim^{7}–♭II^{7}–I^{maj7}–III^{7}–♭III^{7}–II^{7}–♭II^{7}–I^{7}, etc.

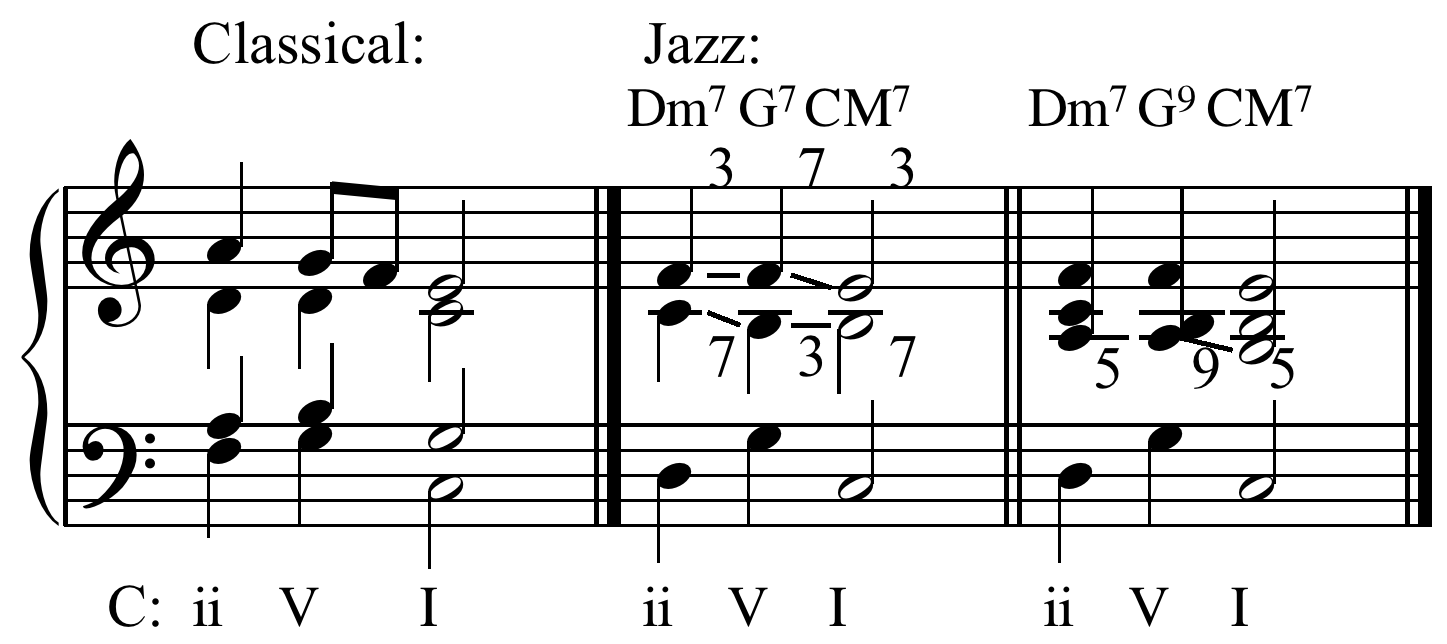
Four-voice classical, three-voice and four-voice jazz "versions" [voicings] of the ii–V^{7}–I progression. The classical example features inversions to emphasize the bass line's independence while the jazz examples feature root progression by fifths and "perfectly smooth voice leading" produced by the 7th of each chord falling a semitone to become the 3rd while the 3rd becomes the 7th of that chord. ii–V–I

== Classical ==
ii–V–I in Bach's WTC I, Prelude in D major.

A ii–V–I progression is part of the vi–ii–V–I progression of root movement by descending fifths, which establishes tonality and also strengthens the key through the contrast of minor and major.

ii–V^{7}–I progression in C minor: Dm^{7♭5}–G^{7}–Cm
Four-voice ii–V–I in C minor: Dm^{7♭5}–G^{♭9}–Cm^{M7}

In minor, a seventh chord built on the supertonic yields a half-diminished seventh chord, which is a very strong predominant chord. Due to what is considered the harsh nature of root position diminished chords, the ii^{ø} chord most often appears in first inversion.

The ii^{ø} chord appears in the natural minor scale and may be considered a minor seventh chord with a flatted fifth and is used in the ii–V–I in minor

== See also ==
- Approach chord
- Bird changes
- Circle progression
- Side-slipping
- Tadd Dameron turnaround
