= Fortspinnung =

German term in music theory

Fortspinnung (English: spinning-forth) is a German term conceived in 1915 to refer to a specific process of development of a musical motif. In this process, the motif is developed into an entire musical structure by using sequences, intervallic changes or simple repetitions. As a principle it exposes a thematic capus (German: Themenkopf) and from there on opens itself to a (mostly) contrapuntal structure, while the reentry of same Themenkopf (often transposed) diverts from the fact that there is no actual closing formula in the Fortspinnungsthema. Thus the Forspinnungsprinzip counters the principle of the German Periode, common to the Wiener Klassik sonata, which is metrically finite (albeit not closing, as such). Everything in the Periode points to a metrically defined point, where its 'end' its 'right border' is expected. This pointing structure is missing, i. e. carefully averted in the Fortspinnung. Thus the Gestalt of the Fortspinnungsthema has a 'rag margin', while the Periode ends more predictably.

It is also possible to use the fortspinnung form term that stands for a structure with three parts:

- Vordersatz: The antecedent or exposition of the motif.
- Fortspinnung: The fortspinnung itself where the motif is developed.
- Epilog: The epilogue or cadence section.

In Baroque music, melodies and their lyrics were prose. Rather than paired lines they consist of rhetorical sentences or paragraphs consisting of an opening gesture, an amplification (often featuring sequence), and a close (featuring a cadence); in German Vordersatz-Fortspinnung-Epilog. For example:

When I was a child,
I spake as a child,
I understood as a child,
I thought as a child;
But when I became a man, I put away childish things.

[opening gesture]
[amplification...]
[...]
[...]
[close]

—1 Corinthians 13

== Examples ==
This developmental process and its resulting musical structure are used mainly in the Baroque period. Here is an example of the fortspinnung process in the first section of the Johann Sebastian Bach Invention No. 4 in D minor (BWV 775):

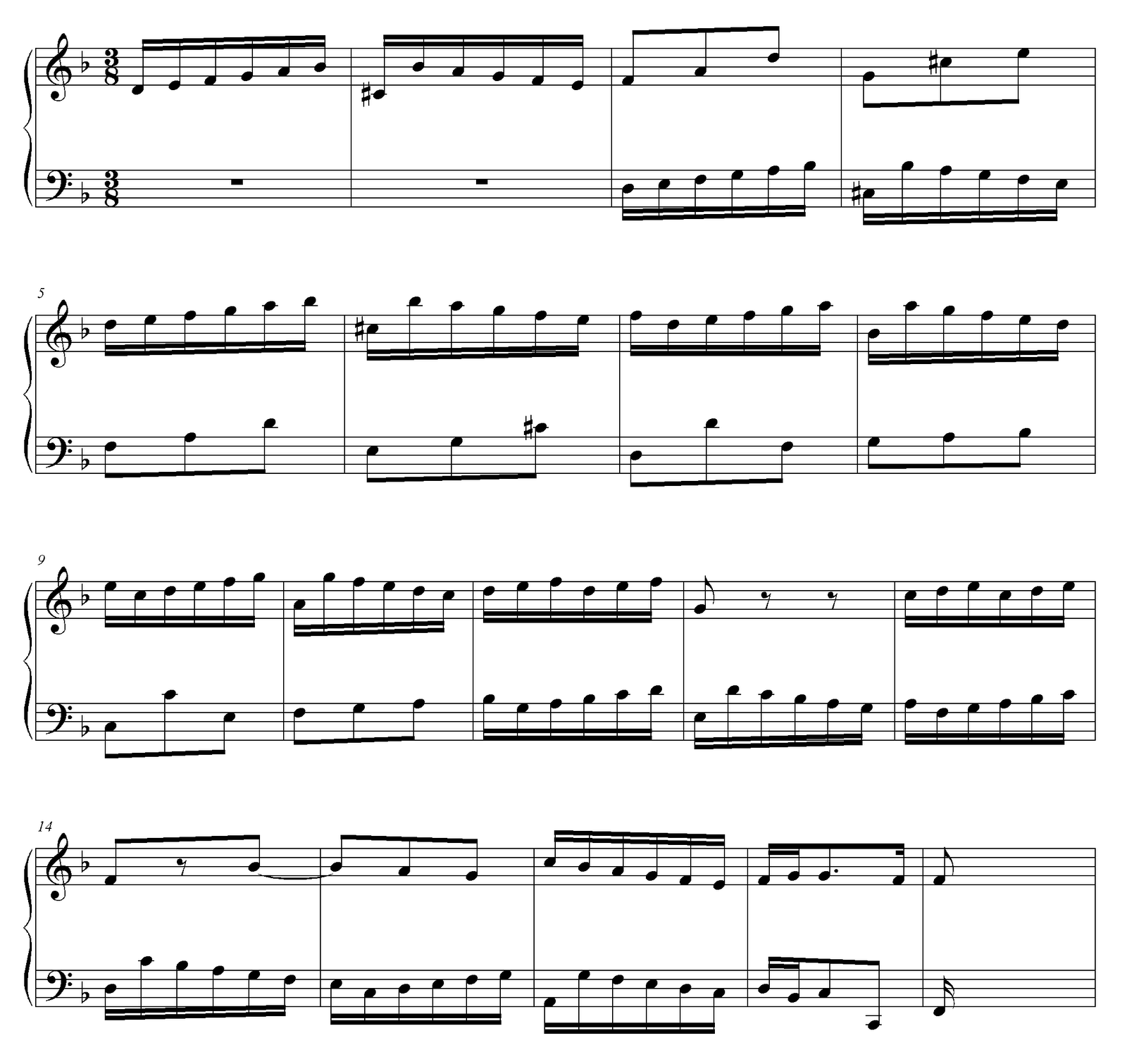
Bach's Invention 4 (section).

Even though it is a Baroque technique, it is also possible to find this process in scores from other composers in different periods, such as Johannes Brahms in the Romantic period:

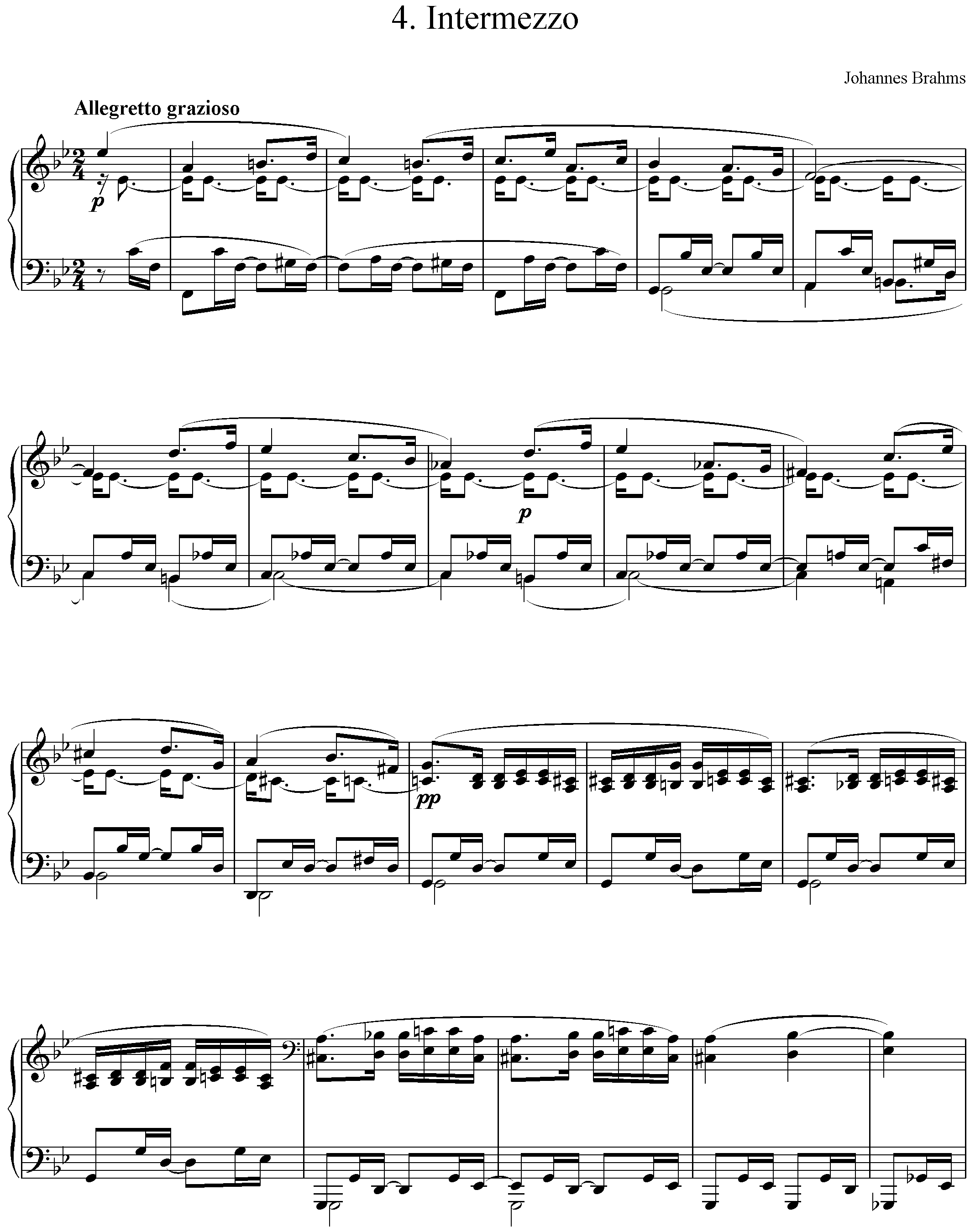
Brahms' Intermezzo 4, Op. 76 (section)
