= Ragtime progression =

Chord progression typical of ragtime

The ragtime progression (E^{7}-A^{7}-D^{7}-G^{7}-C) often appears in the bridge of jazz standards. The III^{7}-VI^{7}-II^{7}-V^{7} (or V^{7}/V/V/V–V^{7}/V/V–V^{7}/V–V^{7}) leads back to C major (I) but is itself indefinite in key.

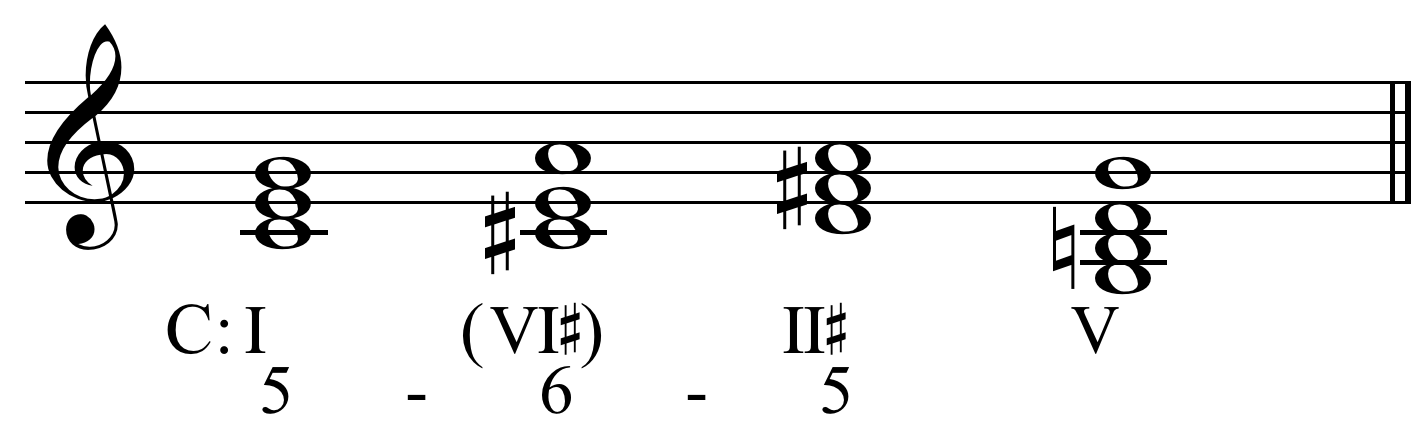
Ragtime progression's origin in voice leading: II itself is the product of a 5–6 replacement over IV in IV–V–I. "Such a replacement originates purely in voice-leading, but" the 6 3 chord above IV (in C, FAD) is a first-inversion II chord.

The ragtime progression is a chord progression characterized by a chain of secondary dominants following the circle of fifths, named for its popularity in the ragtime genre, despite being much older. Also typical of parlour music, its use originated in classical music and later spread to American folk music. Growing, "by a process of gradual accretion. First the dominant chord acquired its own dominant...This then acquired its dominant, which in turn acquired yet another dominant, giving":

It can be represented in Roman numeral analysis as

(V^{7}/V/V/V)	V^{7}/V/V	V^{7}/V	V^{7}	I

or

(III^{7})	VI^{7}	II^{7}	V^{7}	I

In C major this is

(E^{7})	A^{7}	D^{7}	G^{7}	C

Most commonly found in its four-chord version (excluding the chord in parentheses). This may be perceived as a, "harder, bouncier sounding progression," than the diatonic vi–ii–V^{7}–I (in C: Am–Dm–G^{7}–C). The three-chord version (II–V–I) is "related to the cadential progression IV–V–I...in which the V is tonicized and stabilized by means of II with a raised third."

The progression is an example of centripetal harmony, harmony which leads to the tonic and an example of the circle progression, a progression along the circle of fourths. Though creating or featuring chromaticism, the bass (if the roots of the chords), and often the melody, are pentatonic. (major pentatonic on C: C, D, E, G, A) Contrastingly, Averill argues that the progression was used because of the potential it offered for chromatic pitch areas.

Variations include the addition of minor seventh chords before the dominant seventh chords, creating overlapping temporary ii–V–I relationships through ii–V–I substitution:

Bm^{7} E^{7}	Em^{7} A^{7}	Am^{7} D^{7}	Dm^{7} G^{7}	C

since Bm^{7}–E^{7}–A is a ii–V–I progression, as is Em^{7}–A^{7}–D and so on.

Liebestraum No. 3 in A♭ major
Composer Franz Liszt. Performed by Martha Goldstein on an 1851 Erard piano

Examples of the use of the ragtime progression include the chorus of Howard & Emerson's "Hello! Ma Baby" (1899), the traditional "Keep On Truckin' Mama," Robert Johnson's "They're Red Hot" (1936), Arlo Guthrie's "Alice's Restaurant" (1967), Bruce Channel's "Hey! Baby" (1962), Gus Cannon' "Walk Right In" (1929), James P. Johnson's "Charleston" (1923), Ray Henderson's "Five Foot Two, Eyes of Blue" (1925), Rev. Gary Davis's "Salty Dog," Bernie and Pinkard's "Sweet Georgia Brown" (1925), the "Cujus animam" (mm.9-18) in Rossini's Stabat Mater, the beginning of Liszt's Liebesträume (1850), Bob Carleton's "Ja-Da" (1918), and Sonny Rollins's "Doxy" (1954).

== See also ==
- Diatonic function
- Extended dominant
- Rhythm changes
