= I–IV–V–I =

Chord progression

A perfect authentic cadence in four-part harmony

In music, I–IV–V–I or IV–V–I is a chord progression and cadence that, "unequivocally defines the point of origin and the total system, the key." Composers often begin pieces with this progression as an exposition of the tonality:

According to theorist Oswald Jonas, "[a]long with motion toward the fifth (V), IV [the subdominant] appears as a corrective, depriving V (the dominant) of its independence and pointing it back in the direction of its origin [I]." In the key of C, IV provides the note F♮ and eliminates the possibility of G major, which requires F♯. The progression is also often used at the end of works and sections.

A popular variant is vi–IV–V–I, commonly known as the "Komuro progression" (小室進行, komuro shinkō), namesake of Tetsuya Komuro who popularised the progression.

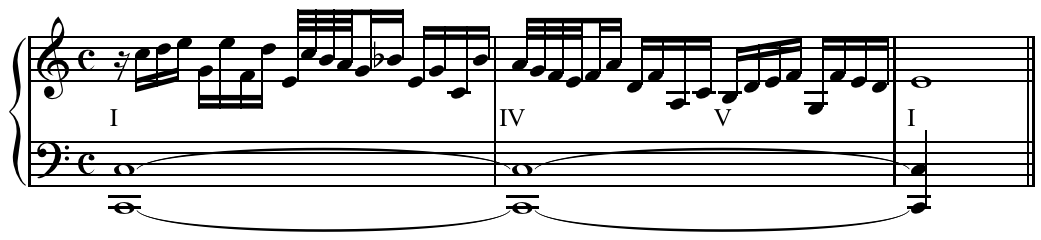
I–IV–V–I chord progression in J.S. Bach's The Well-Tempered Clavier Book II, Prelude in C major.

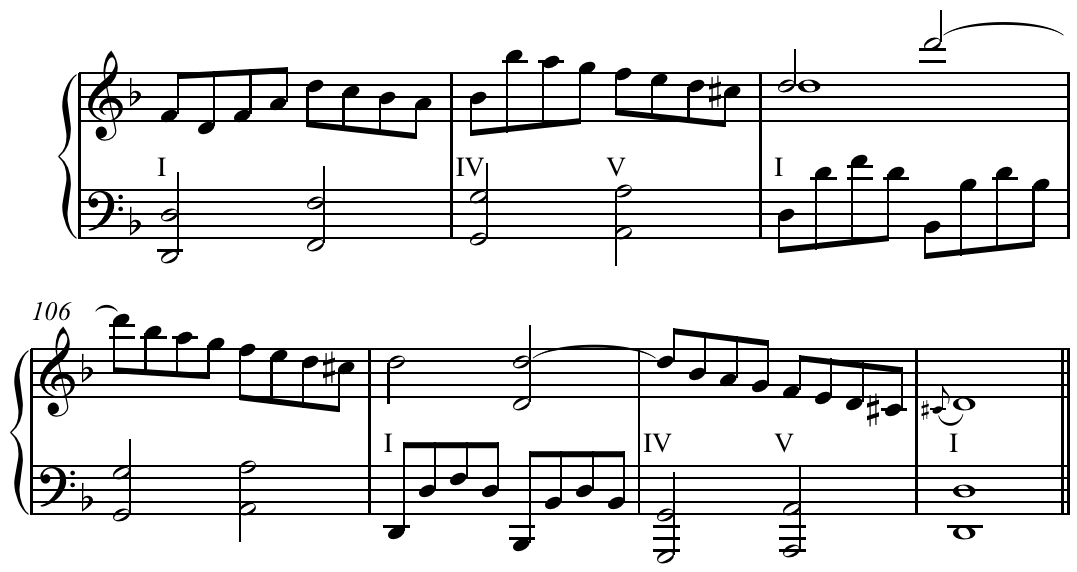
I–IV–V–I chord progression in Scarlatti's Sonata in D minor, K. 517.

== See also ==
- Predominant chord
- Three-chord song
- V–IV–I turnaround
- ii–V–I progression
- Ragtime progression
