= Secondary development =

Section in some classical musical works

A secondary development, in music, is a section that appears in certain musical movements written in sonata form. The secondary development resembles a development section in its musical texture, but is shorter and occurs as a kind of excursion within the recapitulation section.

Charles Rosen, who has written extensively on the concept, presents the idea as follows:

The Secondary Development section appears in the great majority of late eighteenth century works soon after the beginning of the recapitulation and often with the second phrase. Sometimes it is only a few bars long, sometimes very extensive indeed. The purpose of this section is to lower harmonic tension without sacrificing interest: it introduces an allusion to the subdominant or to the related "flat" keys.

The significance of the use of subdominant or similar harmony is related to Rosen's general views on sonata form, in which the exposition section creates a sense of musical tension by moving to the dominant key (which lies upward from the home key by one on the circle of fifths). This tension which is "resolved" in the recapitulation by the return to the tonic. The use of the subdominant in secondary developments, a downward move from the tonic on the circle, provides a sort of balance. As Rosen says, "it is the restoration of harmonic equilibrium as well as the need for variation that gives the Secondary Development its function."

Sometimes the secondary development serves a rather mechanical structural function. In a recapitulation, the musical material that was laid out in the exposition is restated so as to occur entirely (or almost so) in the main key. Thus some kind of alteration is needed to keep the music in the original key, at the spot that corresponds to the place in the exposition where the music changed key. Many secondary developments are placed where they can serve this function. Rosen emphasizes, however, that facilitating the arrangement of keys is not the only or even primary function of a secondary development. As evidence he notes that "the Secondary Development as often as not returns to one of the themes of the first group, which necessitates a still further change later in the section in order to bring the second group into the tonic." As an example Rosen cites Beethoven's "Waldstein" sonata, op. 53.

The secondary development sometimes forms a passage of great drama, even the dramatic climax of the movement. For one such instance, see Rosen's discussion of the secondary development in the opening movement of Haydn's string quartet in B minor, Op. 33 no. 1, or the finale of Brahms's Symphony No. 1 in C minor.

== See also ==
- Secondary chords
