= Secondary chord =

Harmonic device in Western music

Secondary chords in Mozart's Fantasia in C minor, K. 475

Secondary chords are a type of altered or borrowed chord, chords that are not part of the music piece's key. They are the most common type of altered chord in tonal music. Secondary chords are referred to by the function they have and the key or chord in which they function. In Roman numeral analysis, they are written with the notation "function/key". Thus, one of the most common secondary chords, the dominant of the dominant, is written "V/V" and read as "five of five" or "the dominant of the dominant".

The major or minor triad on any diatonic scale degree may have any secondary function applied to it; secondary functions may even be applied to diminished triads in some special circumstances.

Secondary chords were not used until the Baroque period and are found more frequently and freely in the Classical period, even more so in the Romantic period. Composers began to use them less frequently with the breakdown of conventional harmony in modern classical music—but secondary dominants are a cornerstone of popular music and jazz in the 20th century.

== Secondary dominant ==
V7 of V in C, four-part harmony

A secondary dominant (also applied dominant, artificial dominant, or borrowed dominant) is a major triad or dominant seventh chord built and set to resolve to a scale degree other than the tonic. The dominant (seventh) of the dominant (written as V^{7}/V or V^{7} of V) is the most frequently encountered. The chord that the secondary dominant is the dominant of is said to be a temporarily tonicized chord. The secondary dominant is normally, though not always, followed by the tonicized chord. Tonicizations that last longer than a phrase are generally regarded as modulations to a new key (or new tonic).

According to music theorists David Beach and Ryan C. McClelland, "[t]he purpose of the secondary dominant is to place emphasis on a chord within the diatonic progression." The secondary-dominant terminology is still usually applied even if the chord resolution is nonfunctional. For example, the V/ii label is still used even if the V/ii chord is not followed by ii.

=== Definition ===
The major scale contains seven diatonic triads. Because tonic triads tend to be either major or minor, one would not expect to find diminished chords (either the vii^{o} in major or the ii^{o} in minor) tonicized by a secondary dominant. And the tonic of the key itself is not an applicable target to be tonicized, by definition.

In the key of C major, the five remaining chords are:

Of these chords, the V chord (G major) is said to be the dominant of C major. However, each of the chords from ii to vi also has its own dominant. For example, V (G major) has a D major triad as its dominant. These extra dominant chords are not part of the key of C major as such because they include notes that are not part of the C major scale. Instead, they are secondary dominants.

The notation below shows the secondary-dominant chords for C major. Each chord is accompanied by its standard number in harmonic notation. In this notation, a secondary dominant is usually labeled with the formula "V of ..." (dominant chord of); thus "V of ii" stands for the dominant of the ii chord, "V of iii" for the dominant of iii, and so on. A shorter notation, used below, is "V/ii", "V/iii", etc.

Like most chords, secondary dominants may be seventh chords or chords with other upper extensions. (Note: For example, Ottman 1992, p. 308 discusses secondary dominant ninth chords, such as V^{9}/V.) Dominant seventh chords are commonly used as secondary dominants. The notation below shows the same secondary dominants as above but with dominant seventh chords.

Note that the triad V/IV is the same as the I triad. When a seventh is added (V^{7}/IV), it becomes an altered chord because the seventh is not a diatonic pitch. Beethoven's Symphony No. 1 begins with a V^{7}/IV chord:

According to the principles exposed above, in fact, V^{7}/IV, which means the C^{7} chord, i.e. the dominant seventh chord on the F major scale (C–E–G–B♭), does not represent the tonic because it contains a B♭, which isn't included in the main key, as Beethoven's Symphony No. 1 is written in the key of C major. The chord then resolves on the natural IV (F major) and in the following bar the V^{7}, i.e. G^{7} (dominant seventh chord on the C major key), is presented.

Chromatic mediants, for example VI is also a secondary dominant of ii (V/ii) and III is V/vi, are distinguished from secondary dominants with context and analysis revealing the distinction.

=== History ===
Secondary dominants in Beethoven's Piano Sonata No. 10, op. 14, no. 2, mvmt. II

Before the 20th century, in the music of J.S. Bach, Mozart, Beethoven, and Brahms, a secondary dominant, along with its chord of resolution, was considered a modulation. Since this was a rather self-contradictory description, theorists in the early 1900s, such as Hugo Riemann (who used the term "Zwischendominante"—"intermediary dominant", still the usual German term for a secondary dominant), searched for a better description of the phenomenon.

Walter Piston first used the analysis "V^{7} of IV" in a monograph entitled Principles of Harmonic Analysis. (Note: Notably, Piston's analytical symbol always used the word "of"—e.g. "V^{7} of IV" rather than the virgule V^{7}/IV.) In his 1941 book Harmony, Piston used the term "secondary dominant". At around the same time (1946–48), Arnold Schoenberg created the expression "artificial dominant" to describe the same phenomenon, in his posthumously published book Structural Functions of Harmony.

In the fifth edition of Walter Piston's Harmony, a passage from the last movement of Mozart's Piano Sonata K. 283 in G major serves as one illustration of secondary dominants. This passage has three secondary dominants. The final four chords form a circle of fifths progression, ending in a standard dominant-tonic cadence, which concludes the phrase.

=== In jazz and popular music ===
Measure 2 shows a bebop cliché arpeggio upwards from the third to the ninth of A^{7♭9}, which is the secondary dominant of D minor, the ii chord in the key of C (V/ii).

Secondary dominant in "I'd Like to Teach the World to Sing" (1971), mm. 1–8

In jazz harmony, a secondary dominant is any dominant seventh chord on a weak beat and resolves downward by a perfect fifth. Thus, a chord is a secondary dominant when it functions as the dominant of some harmonic element other than the key's tonic and resolves to that element. This is slightly different from the traditional use of the term, where a secondary dominant does not have to be a seventh chord, occur on a weak beat, or resolve downward. If a non-diatonic dominant chord is used on a strong beat, it is considered an extended dominant. If it doesn't resolve downward, it may be a borrowed chord.

Secondary dominants are used in jazz harmony in the bebop blues and other blues progression variations, as are substitute dominants and turnarounds. In some jazz tunes, all or almost all of the chords that are used are dominant chords. For example, in the standard jazz chord progression ii–V–I, which would normally be Dm–G^{7}–C in the key of C major, some tunes will use D^{7}–G^{7}–C^{7}. Since jazz tunes are often based on the circle of fifths, this creates long sequences of secondary dominants.

Secondary dominants are also used in popular music. Examples include II^{7} (V^{7}/V) in Bob Dylan's "Don't Think Twice, It's All Right" and III^{7} (V^{7}/vi) in Betty Everett's "The Shoop Shoop Song (It's in His Kiss)". "Five Foot Two, Eyes of Blue" features chains of secondary dominants. "Sweet Georgia Brown" opens with V/V/V–V/V–V–I.

=== Extended dominant ===
A diatonic I–vi–ii–V turnaround and a progression with secondary dominants: I–V/V/V–V/V–V–I

An extended dominant chord is a secondary dominant seventh chord that resolves down by a fifth to another dominant seventh chord. A series of extended dominant chords continues to resolve downwards by the circle of fifths until it reaches the tonic chord. The most common extended dominant chord is the tertiary dominant, which resolves to a secondary dominant. For example, V/V/V (in C major, A^{(7)}) resolves to V/V (D^{(7)}), which resolves to V (G^{(7)}), which resolves to I. Note that V/V/V is the same chord as V/ii, but differs in its resolution to a major dominant rather than a minor chord.

Quaternary dominants are rarer, but an example is the bridge section of the rhythm changes, which starts from V/V/V/V (in C major, E^{(7)}). The example below from Chopin's Polonaises, Op. 26, No. 1 (1835) has a quaternary dominant in the second beat (V/ii = V/V/V, V/vi = V/V/V/V).

== Secondary leading-tone ==
A secondary leading-tone half-diminished chord in
Brahms's Intermezzo, op. 119, no. 3 (1893)
Three measures from "Easy Living"
showing secondary leading-tone chords.

In music theory, a secondary leading-tone chord is a secondary chord that is rooted on a tone that is a leading-tone of (in short, has a strong affinity to resolve to) a tone just 1 semitone from that root (typically 1 semitone above, though can be below). Like the secondary dominant it can be used as tonicization of only one subsequent chord (which will be rooted in the resolution tone), or the music can continue with other chords/notes in the key of that chord's root for a phrase, or even longer to be considered a modulation to that key. This one-semitone-apart resolution of the secondary leading-tone is in contrast to the secondary dominant which resolves through a wider distance of perfect fifth below or perfect fourth above the chord's root (as per the two distances between dominant and tonic).

While the root of a secondary leading-tone chord needs to be the leading-tone, the other notes may vary and form with it one of: the triad or one of the diminished sevenths (as in seventh scale degree or leading-tone, not necessarily seventh chord) where the type of the diminished seventh is typically related to the type of tonicized triad:

1. If the tonicized triad is minor, the leading-tone chord is fully diminished seventh chord.
2. If it is major, the leading-tone chord may be either half-diminished or fully diminished, though fully diminished chords are used more often.

Because of their symmetry, secondary leading-tone diminished seventh chords are also useful for modulation; all four notes may be considered the root of any diminished seventh chord. They may resolve to these major or minor diatonic triads:

In major keys: ii, iii, IV, V, vi
In minor keys: III, iv, V, VI

Especially in four-part writing, the seventh should resolve downwards by step and if possible the lower tritone should resolve appropriately, inwards if a diminished fifth and outwards if an augmented fourth, as the example below shows.

Secondary leading-tone chords were not used until the Baroque period and are found more frequently and less conventionally in the Classical period. They are found even more frequently and freely in the Romantic period, but they began to be used less frequently with the breakdown of conventional harmony.

The chord progression vii^{o}^{7}/V–V–I is quite common in ragtime music.

== Secondary supertonic ==
A secondary supertonic chord: ii^{7}/V–V/V–V in C major (a^{7}–D^{7}–G)

The secondary supertonic chord, or secondary second, is a secondary chord that is on the supertonic scale degree. Rather than tonicizing a degree other than the tonic, as does a secondary dominant, it creates a temporary dominant. Examples include ii^{7}/III (F♯min.^{7}, in C major), ii^{7}/II (Amin.^{7}, in F major), ii^{7}/V (Emin.^{7}, in G major), and ii^{7}/IV (Bmin.^{7}, in E major).

== Secondary subdominant ==
The secondary subdominant is the subdominant (IV) of the tonicized chord. For example, in G major, the supertonic chord is A minor and the IV of ii chord is D major.

== Others ==
The other secondary functions are the secondary mediant, the secondary submediant, and the secondary subtonic.

== See also ==
- Barbershop seventh chord – Major triad plus the harmonic seventh interval
- Backdoor progression – Jazz chord progression
- Circle progression – Type of chord progression
- Common-tone diminished seventh chord – Type of musical chord
- ii–V–I progression – Common chord progression
- Secondary development – Section in some classical musical works
- Subtonic – Degree of a musical scale

== Bibliography ==
- Beach, David; McClelland, Ryan C. (2012). Analysis of 18th- and 19th-century Musical Works in the Classical Tradition. Routledge. ISBN 9780415806657.
- Benward, Bruce; Saker, Marilyn Nadine (2003). Music: In Theory and Practice. Vol. I (7th ed.). McGraw-Hill. ISBN 978-0-07-294262-0.
- Blatter, Alfred (2007). Revisiting Music Theory: A Guide to the Practice. ISBN 0-415-97440-2.
- Boyd, Bill (1997). Jazz Chord Progressions. ISBN 0-7935-7038-7.
- Everett, Walter (2009). The Foundations of Rock. ISBN 978-0-19-531023-8.
- Kostka, Stefan; Payne, Dorothy (2004). Tonal Harmony (5th ed.). Boston: McGraw-Hill. ISBN 0072852607. OCLC 51613969.
- Ottman, Robert W. (1992) [1961]. Advanced Harmony: Theory and Practice (4th ed.). Englewood Cliffs, NJ: Prentice Hall. ISBN 0-13-006016-X.
- Piston, Walter (1933). Principles of Harmonic Analysis. Boston: E. C. Schirmer. [ISBN unspecified]
- Piston, Walter (1941). Harmony. New York: W. W. Norton & Company, Inc. [ISBN unspecified]
- Piston, Walter (1987) [First published 1941]. Harmony. Revised and expanded by Mark Devoto (5th ed.). New York: W. W. Norton & Company, Inc. ISBN 978-0-393-95480-7.
- Rawlins, Robert; Bahha, Nor Eddine (2005). Jazzology: The Encyclopedia of Jazz Theory for All Musicians. ISBN 0-634-08678-2.
- Lawn, Richard; Hellmer, Jeffrey L. (1996). Jazz: Theory and Practice. ISBN 978-0-88284-722-1.
- Russo, William (2015) [1961]. Composing for the Jazz Orchestra. University of Chicago. ISBN 978-0-226-73209-1.
- Schoenberg, Arnold (1954). Searle, Humphrey (ed.). Structural Functions of Harmony. New York: W. W. Norton & Company, Inc.
- Shepherd, John (2003). Continuum Encyclopedia of Popular Music of the World. Vol. II: Performance and Production. A&C Black. ISBN 9780826463227.
- Spitzer, Peter (2001). Jazz Theory Handbook. ISBN 0-7866-5328-0.
- White, John D. (1976). The Analysis of Music. ISBN 0-13-033233-X.
