= Development (music) =

Process by which an idea is communicated through a composition

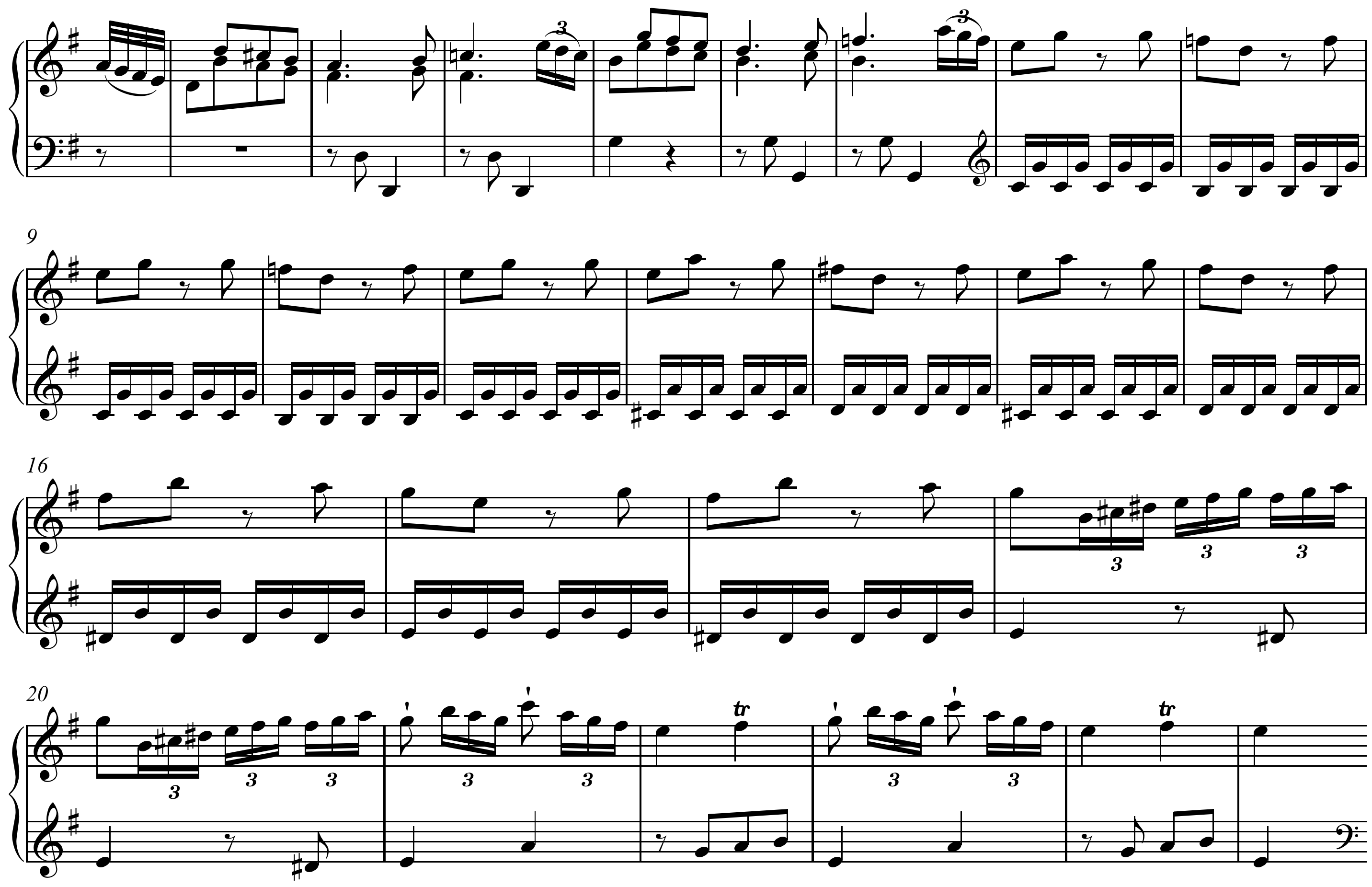
Development in Haydn's sonata in G major, Hob. XVI:G1, I, mm. 29–53.

In music, development is a process by which a musical idea is transformed and restated in the course of a composition. Certain central ideas are repeated in different contexts or in altered form so that the listener can consciously or unconsciously compare the various statements of the idea, often in surprising or ironic manners. This practice has its roots in counterpoint, where a theme or subject might create an impression of a pleasing or affective sort, but delight the mind further as its contrapuntal capabilities are gradually unveiled in a fugal development.

Development is often contrasted with musical variation, which is a slightly different means to the same end. Development is carried out upon portions of material treated in many different presentations and combinations at a time, while variation depends upon one type of presentation at a time.

The development is the middle section of the sonata form, between the exposition and the recapitulation.

== Methods of development ==
According to The Oxford Companion to Music there are several ways of developing a theme. These include:

- The division of a theme into parts, each of which can be developed in any of the above ways or recombined in a new way. Similarly, two or more themes can be developed in combination; in some cases, themes are composed with this possibility in mind.
- Alteration of pitch intervals while retaining the original rhythm.
- Rhythmic displacement, so that the metrical stress occurs at a different point in the otherwise unchanged theme.
- Sequence, either diatonically within a key or through a succession of keys.

The Scherzo movement from Beethoven's Piano Sonata No. 15 in D major, Op 28 (the "Pastoral" Sonata) shows a number of these processes at work on a small scale. Charles Rosen (2002) marvels at the simplicity of the musical material: "The opening theme consists of nothing but four F sharps in descending octaves, followed by a light and simple I/ii/V7/I cadence with a quirky motif repeated four times." These opening eight bars provide all the material Beethoven needs to furnish his development, which takes place in bars 33-48:

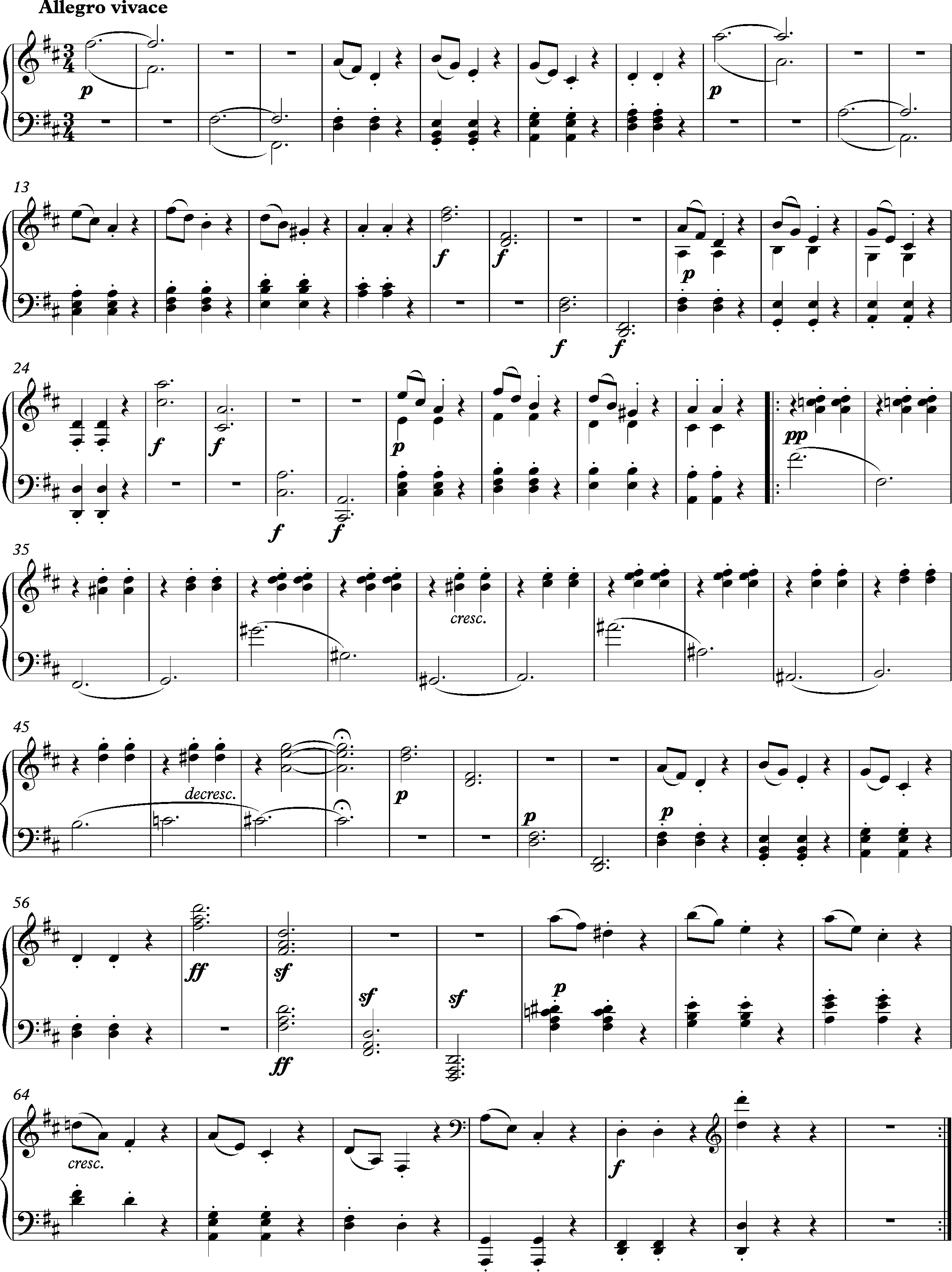
Beethoven Pastoral Sonata Op. 28 Scherzo

=== Division of a theme into parts ===
The falling octave in the first two bars and the repeated staccato chord in the left hand in bars 5-8 are the two fragments that Beethoven later develops:

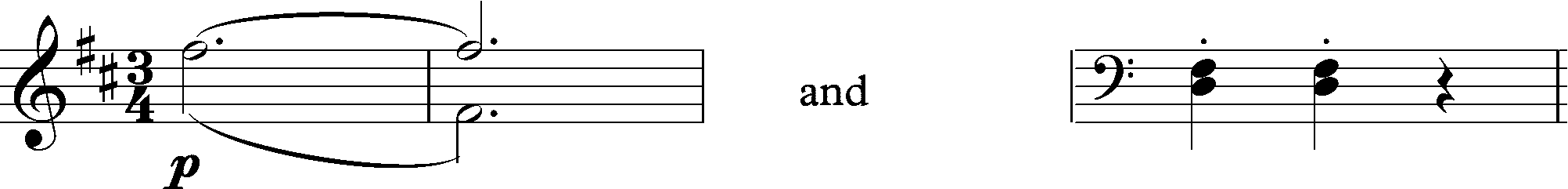
Beethoven Scherzo from Piano Sonata 15, thematic fragments used later in the development

=== Alteration of pitch intervals ===
The somewhat bald falling octave idea in the first four bars is transformed in bars 33-36 into an elegant shape ending with an upward-curving semitone:

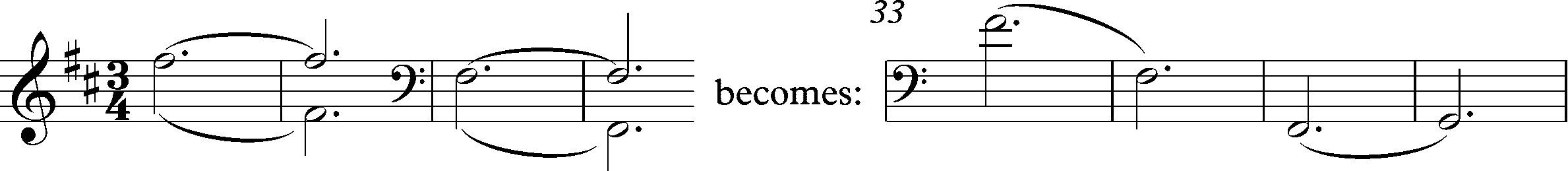
Transformation of opening idea

=== Rhythmic displacement ===
In this movement, the repeated left hand chords in bar 5 are displaced so that in bar 33 onwards, they fall on the 2nd and 3rd beats:

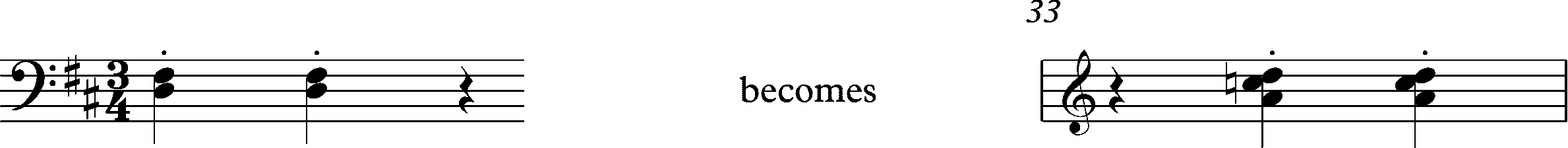
Rhythmic displacement

=== Sequence and the development of two or more themes in combination ===
In bars 33-48, the two fragments combine and the development goes through a modulating sequence that touches on a succession of keys;

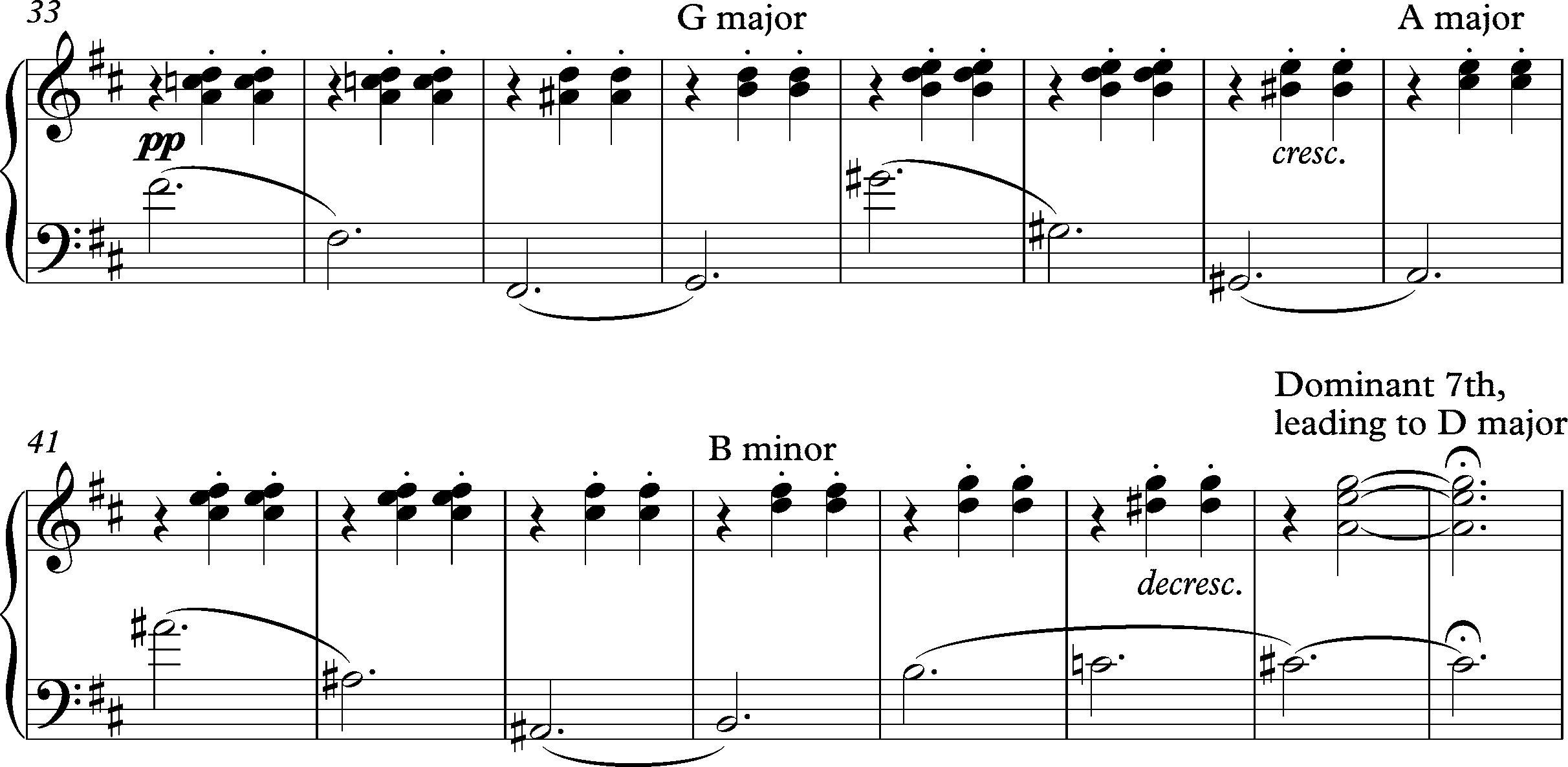
Beethoven, Scherzo from Sonata No 15, development section

The following outline demonstrates Beethoven's strategic planning, which he applied on a larger scale in the development sections of some of his major works. The bass line traces a decisive progression through a rising chromatic scale:

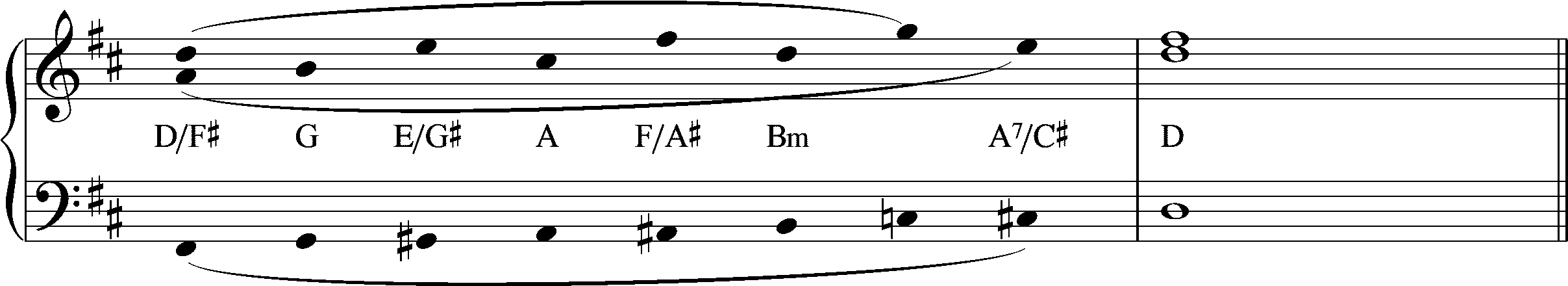
Harmonic outline of bars 33–49

To quote Rosen again, writing about this movement: "As Beethoven's contemporary, the painter John Constable, said, making something out of nothing is the true work of the artist."

== Development on a larger scale ==
Not all development takes place in what is commonly known as the "development section" of a work. It can take place at any point in the musical argument. For instance, the "immensely energetic sonata movement" that forms the main body of the overture to Mozart's opera Don Giovanni announces the following theme during the initial exposition. It consists of two contrasting phrases: "first determined, then soft and conspiratorial".

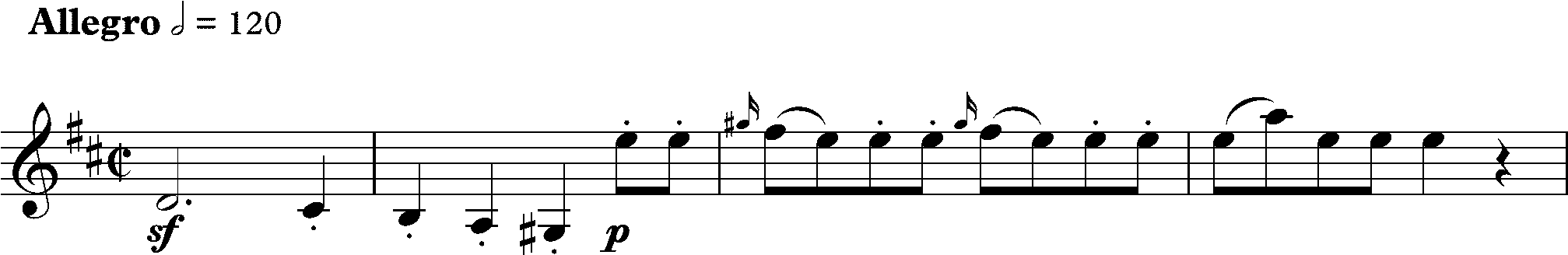
Don Giovanni overture bars 77–80

William Mann says "the first, insistent phrase [of the above] is very important. At once it is taken up imitatively by various departments of the orchestra, and [starting in] A major, jumps through several related keys." Each repetition of the descending phrase is subtly altered one note at a time, causing the music to pass from the key of A major, through A minor and thence via a chord of G7 to the remote key of C major, and thence back to A major.

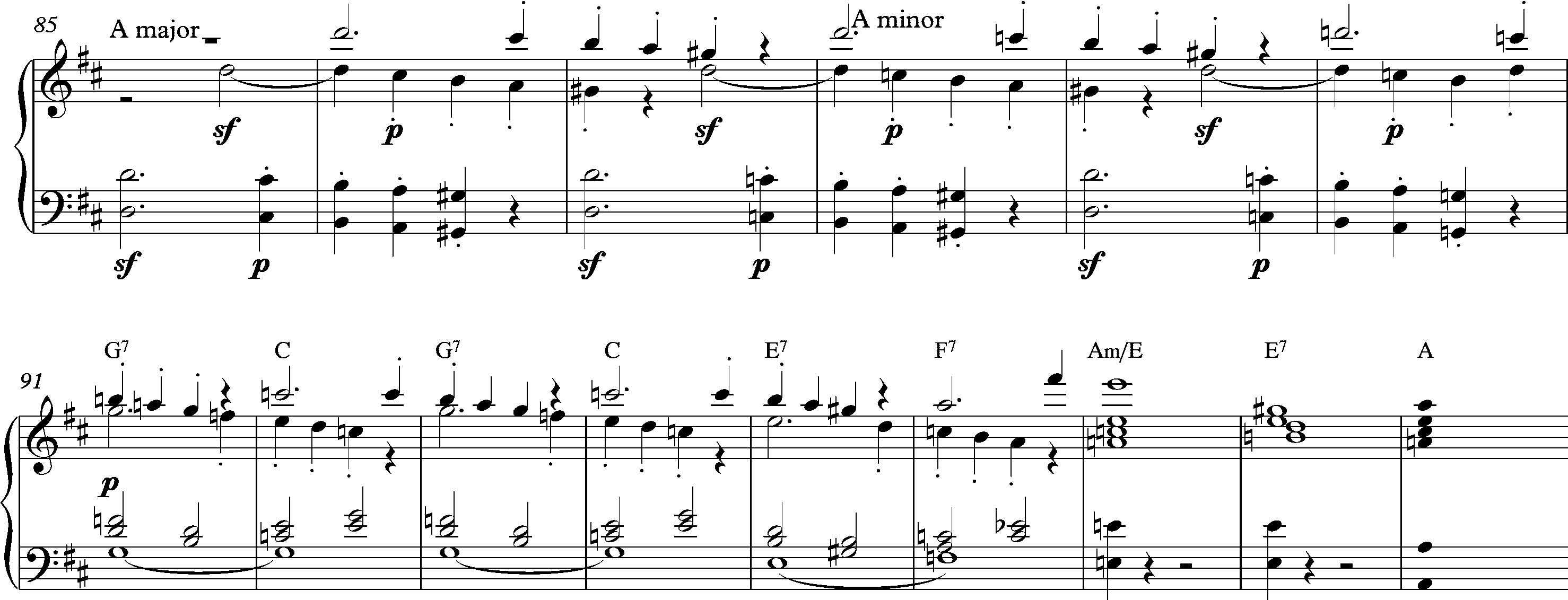
Don Giovanni overture bars 85–100

The central section of the overture (the part commonly known as the "development section") utilizes both phrases of the theme "in new juxtapositions and new tonalities", developing it through repetition in a modulating sequence. The steady plod of the bass line against the sequential repetitions of the "soft and conspiratorial" phrase outlines a circle of fifths chord progression:

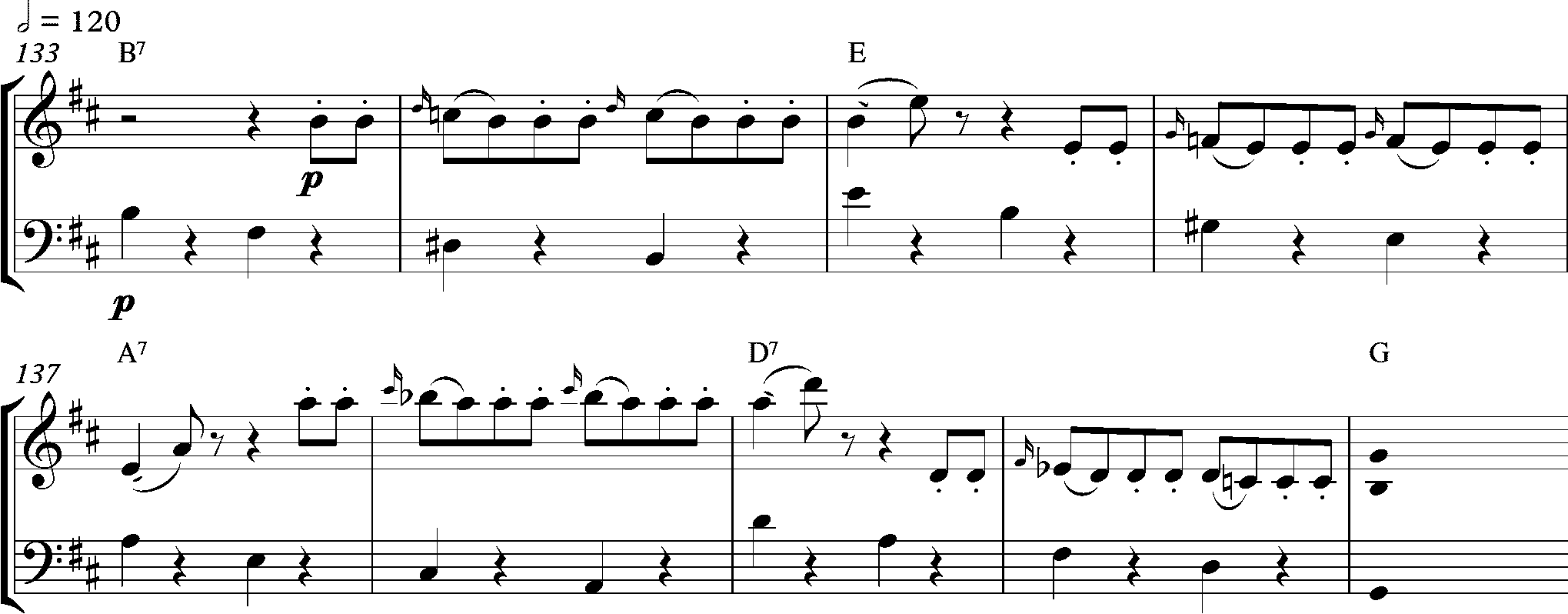
Don Giovanni overture bars 133–141 violins and bass only

Simultaneously, Mozart adds to the mix and continues to develop the imitative counterpoint that grew out of the first phrase. In the words of Willam Mann, this development "unites both halves" of the theme. This is how this tightly woven texture pans out:

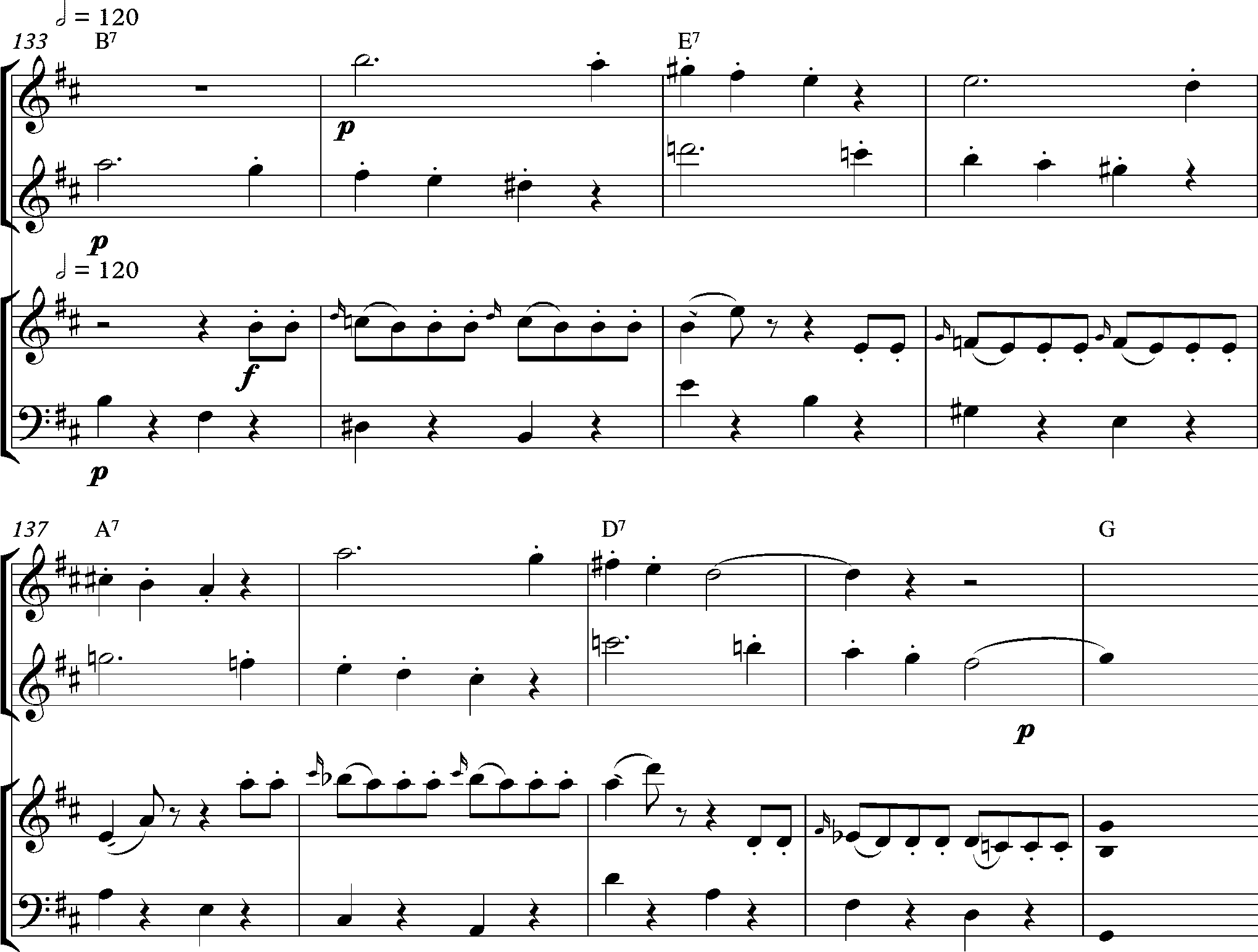
Don Giovanni overture bars 133–142

== See also ==
- Developing variation
- Secondary development
- Sequence (music)
