= Tonicization =

Treatment of a pitch other than the overall tonic, in music

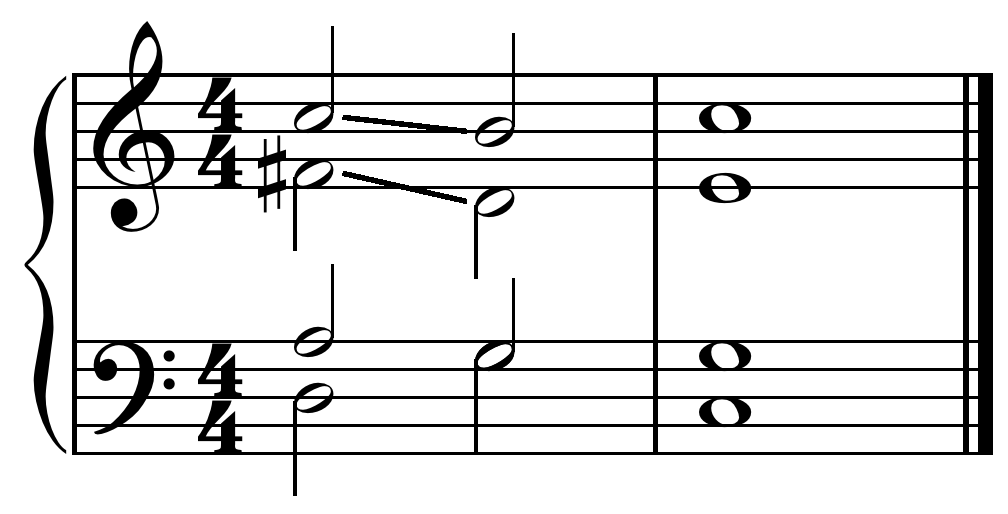
V of V in C, four-part harmony

In music, tonicization is the treatment of a pitch other than the overall tonic (the "home note" of a piece) as a temporary tonic in a composition. In tonal music, pieces (or sections) are in a key. This means that the tonic chord has a corresponding dominant chord (e.g., in the key of C major, the tonic chord is C major and the dominant chord is G major or G^{7}). The dominant chord, especially if it is a dominant seventh chord, is said to resolve to (or leading to) the tonic, due to the leading note in the dominant chord resolving to the tonic note.

A tonicized chord is a chord other than the tonic chord that a dominant chord resolves to. When a dominant chord is used before a chord other than the tonic, this dominant or dominant seventh chord is called a secondary dominant. When a chord is tonicized, this makes this non-tonic chord sound temporarily like a tonic chord.

== Examples ==
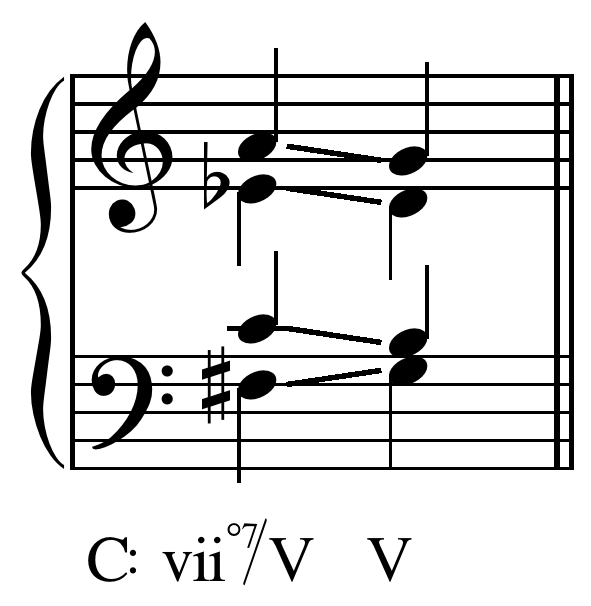
Secondary leading-tone chord: vii^{o}^{7}/V - V in C major. This may also be considered an altered IV^{7} (FACE becomes F♯ACE♭).

Using Roman numeral chord analysis, a chord labeled "V/ii" (colloquially referred to as "five of two") would refer to the V chord of a different key; specifically, a key named after the ii chord of the original tonic. This would usually resolve to the ii chord (of the original key). In this situation, the ii has been tonicized.

For example, in a piece in the key of C major, the ii chord is D minor, because D is the second scale degree in a C major scale. The D is minor because to construct a triad over D using only the pitches available in the key of C major—i.e. no sharps, no flats—the triad must be minor—the individual notes D, F and A. The V/ii chord is composed of the pitches in a V chord in the key of ii (key of D minor). The pitches used in a V/ii in this example include the notes A, C♯ and E (creating an A major chord). In the key of D minor, an A major chord is the dominant chord. In the key of C major, C sharp is an accidental. One can often find examples of tonicization by looking for accidentals, as there are always accidentals involved in tonicization. The opposite is not true—just because there is an accidental does not mean that it is definitely a case of tonicization.

By Western convention, only the major and minor chords may be tonicized. Diminished chords and augmented chords cannot be tonicized because they do not represent stable key areas in Western music, and acoustically do not carry the reinforcing interval of a perfect fifth. For example, a B minor chord (B, D, F♯) occurring in any of its closely related keys may be tonicized with an F♯ major chord (V/V) because B minor also represents a key area—the key of B minor. However, a B diminished chord (B, D, F) may not be tonicized because "B diminished" could not be a stable key area; there is no key area in Western classical music that has B, D, & F—the pitches that make up the B diminished chord—as the first, third and fifth scale degrees, respectively. This holds true of all diminished and augmented chords.

Tonicizations may last for multiple chords. Taking the example given above with the chord progression V/ii → ii, it is possible to extend this sequence backwards. Instead of just V/ii → ii, there could be iv/ii → V/ii → ii (additionally, thinking about the last chord in the sequence: ii, as i/ii, it becomes clear why the phrase "temporary tonic"—see above—is often used in relation to tonicization). Though perceptions vary as a general rule if a chord is treated as the tonic for longer than a phrase before returning to the previous key area, then the treatment is considered a modulation to a new key.

== Modulation ==
In a song in C major, if a composer treats another key as the tonic (for example, the ii chord, D minor) for a short period by alternating between A7 (the notes A, C♯, E and G) and D minor, and then returns to the tonic (C major), this is a tonicization of the key of D minor. However, if a song in C major shifts to the key of D minor and stays in this second, new key for a significant period, then this is usually considered to be a modulation to the new key (in this case, from C major to D minor). In effect, D minor has become the new key of the song.

"A secondary dominant is like a miniature modulation; for just an instant, the harmony moves out of the diatonic chords of the key."

== See also ==
- Secondary leading-tone chord
