= List of set classes =

Set 3-1 has three possible versions: [0_{1}1_{1}2_{T}], [0_{1}1_{T}E_{1}], and [0_{T}T_{1}E_{1}], where subscripts indicate adjacency intervals. The normal form is the smallest "slice of pie" (shaded) or most compact form; in this case, [0_{1}1_{1}2_{T}].

This is a list of set classes, by Forte number. In music theory, a set class (an abbreviation of pitch-class-set class) is an ascending collection of pitch classes, transposed to begin at zero. For a list of ordered collections, see this list of tone rows and series.

Sets are listed with links to their complements. For asymmetrical sets, the prime form is marked with "A" and the inversion with "B"; sets without either are symmetrical. Sets marked with a "Z" refer to a pair of different set classes with identical interval class content unrelated by inversion, with one of each pair listed at the end of the respective list when they occur. ("Z" is derived from the prefix zygo-, from Ancient Greek ζυγόν, "yoke". Hence: zygosets.) "T" and "E" are conventionally used in sets to notate ten and eleven, respectively, as single characters. Because, for any given set, its interval-class vector is independent of the version (cyclic permutation) considered, for any cardinality, the ordering of sets in the list (except for Z-related sets, as explained below) is based on the string of numerals in the interval vector treated as an integer, decreasing in value, following the strategy used by Forte in constructing his numbering system.

There are two slightly different methods of obtaining the prime form—an earlier one by Allen Forte and a later but now generally more popular one by John Rahn—both often confusingly described as "most packed to the left". However, a more precise description of the Rahn spelling is to select the version most dispersed from the right, whereas the precise description of the Forte spelling is to select the version most packed to the left within the smallest span. (Note: Forte and Rahn both list prime forms as the most left-packed possible version of a set. However, Forte packs from the left and Rahn packs from the right ("making the small numbers smaller," versus making "the larger numbers [...] smaller").) In the lists here, the Rahn spelling is used for the 17 out of 352 set classes where the two methods yield different results; the alternative Forte spellings are listed in the footnotes.

Before either (1960–67), however, Elliott Carter had produced a numbered listing of pitch class sets, or "chords", as Carter referred to them, for his own use. Donald Martino had produced tables of hexachords, tetrachords, trichords, and pentachords for combinatoriality in his 1961 article, "The Source Set and its Aggregate Formations".

Predating set-theoretic terminology, Howard Hanson's book, "Harmonic Materials of Modern Music", was published in 1960. Hanson analysed all "sonorities" available within the resources of the tempered scale portrayed in staff notation and including adjacency intervals, generated organically, mainly by projection, inversion, and complementation, and catalogued using an alphabetical system representing a tally of the intervals (less than or equal to a tritone) of each sonority: p (perfect fourth), m (major third), n (minor third), s (major second), d (minor second), and t (tritone), with superscripts representing multiplicities. For example, Forte's set 6-33 would be catalogued using Hanson's system as: p^{4}m^{2}n^{3}s^{4}dt, corresponding to the interval-class vector ⟨1,4,3,2,4,1⟩.

The magnitude of the difference between the interval-class vector of a set and that of its complement is given by ⟨X, X, X, X, X, X/2⟩, where (in base-ten) X = 12 – 2C, where C is the smaller set's cardinality. In nearly all cases, complements of asymmetrical sets are related by inversion—that is, the complement of an "A" version of a set of cardinality C is (usually) the "B" version of the respective complementary set of cardinality 12 – C. The most significant exceptions are the sets 4-14/8-14, 5-11/7-11, and 6-14, which are all closely related in terms of subset/superset structure. For example, 5-11 is a subset of 6-14, and 4-14 is a subset of 5-11. Similarly, set 7-11 is a superset of 6-14 and 8-14 is a superset of 7-11. Set 6-14 is unique in that it is the only asymmetrical hexad whose complement is the same as the original rather than its inverse.

Allen Forte's own rule for numbering is usually applied to determine which zygote appears in the main list and which appears added at the end (with a much larger index number) as well; in other words, the one with the lower number has an equal or lesser minimum span. For example, for the all-interval tetrads, 4-Z15 and 4-Z29, the former has a minimum span of 6 semitones and the latter 7 semitones. Meanwhile, sets 5-Z17 and 5-Z37 both have a minimum span of 8 semitones, but the former is more packed to the left; adjacency intervals of 1-2-1-4-4 versus 3-1-1-3-4.

However, in the heptads, zygotic pairs with higher numbers have a smaller minimum span. For each of the pairs 7-Z12 versus 7-Z36, 7-Z17 versus 7-Z37, and 7-Z18 versus 7-Z38, the first member has a minimum span of 9 semitones and the second member 8 semitones. Clearly, they have been assigned index numbers corresponding to their pentad complements instead of following the general rule.

Additionally, there is one genuine anomaly in the ordering of the hexads, clearly a mistake on Forte's part: sets 6-Z28 versus 6-Z49. Their minimum span is the same (9), but their adjacency intervals are 1-2-2-1-3-3 versus 1-2-1-3-2-3. According to Forte's own rule, this ordering is incorrect – the set [0_{1}1_{2}3_{1}4_{3}7_{2}9_{3}] is more packed to the left (within the same span) and should have been assigned the lower number, i.e. 6-Z28, with [0_{1}1_{2}3_{2}5_{1}6_{3}9_{3}] given the higher number 6-Z49, as can be seen at a glance by comparing the respective adjacency-interval strings listed as subscripts between adjacent pc values rather than (information-free) commas. However, note (again from the adjacency-interval strings) that 6-Z28 is clearly more dispersed from the right than 6-Z49, which gives 6-Z28 precedence according to Rahn's prime-form rule. To avoid confusion, the original Forte numbering system is retained here for both.

== List ==
Forte no.	Prime form	Interval vector	Carter no.	Audio	Possible spacings	Complement
0-1	[]	<0,0,0,0,0,0>			Empty set	12-1
1-1	[0]	<0,0,0,0,0,0>			Unison, octave	11-1
2-1	[0,1]	<1,0,0,0,0,0>	1		Minor second, major seventh	10-1
2-2	[0,2]	<0,1,0,0,0,0>	2		Major second, minor seventh	10-2
2-3	[0,3]	<0,0,1,0,0,0>	3		Minor third, major sixth	10-3
2-4	[0,4]	<0,0,0,1,0,0>	4		Major third, minor sixth	10-4
2-5	[0,5]	<0,0,0,0,1,0>	5		Perfect fourth, perfect fifth	10-5
2-6	[0,6]	<0,0,0,0,0,1>	6		Augmented fourth, diminished fifth, tritone	10-6
3-1	[0,1,2]	<2,1,0,0,0,0>	4		Chromatic trichord	9-1
3-2A	[0,1,3]	<1,1,1,0,0,0>	12		...	9-2B
3-2B	[0,2,3]	<1,1,1,0,0,0>	12		...	9-2A
3-3A	[0,1,4]	<1,0,1,1,0,0>	11		...	9-3B
3-3B	[0,3,4]	<1,0,1,1,0,0>	11		...	9-3A
3-4A	[0,1,5]	<1,0,0,1,1,0>	9		...	9-4B
3-4B	[0,4,5]	<1,0,0,1,1,0>	9		...	9-4A
3-5A	[0,1,6]	<1,0,0,0,1,1>	7		Viennese trichord	9-5B
3-5B	[0,5,6]	<1,0,0,0,1,1>	7		Viennese trichord	9-5A
3-6	[0,2,4]	<0,2,0,1,0,0>	3		...	9-6
3-7A	[0,2,5]	<0,1,1,0,1,0>	10		...	9-7B
3-7B	[0,3,5]	<0,1,1,0,1,0>	10		Blues trichord (minor pentatonic subset)	9-7A
3-8A	[0,2,6]	<0,1,0,1,0,1>	8		Italian sixth chord	9-8B
3-8B	[0,4,6]	<0,1,0,1,0,1>	8		...	9-8A
3-9	[0,2,7]	<0,1,0,0,2,0>	5		Suspended chord	9-9
3-10	[0,3,6]	<0,0,2,0,0,1>	2		Diminished chord	9-10
3-11A	[0,3,7]	<0,0,1,1,1,0>	6		Minor chord, Neapolitan chord	9-11B
3-11B	[0,4,7]	<0,0,1,1,1,0>	6		Major chord	9-11A
3-12	[0,4,8]	<0,0,0,3,0,0>	1		Augmented chord	9-12
4-1	[0,1,2,3]	<3,2,1,0,0,0>	1		BACH motif	8-1
4-2A	[0,1,2,4]	<2,2,1,1,0,0>	17		...	8-2B
4-2B	[0,2,3,4]	<2,2,1,1,0,0>	17		...	8-2A
4-3	[0,1,3,4]	<2,1,2,1,0,0>	9		DSCH motif	8-3
4-4A	[0,1,2,5]	<2,1,1,1,1,0>	20		...	8-4B
4-4B	[0,3,4,5]	<2,1,1,1,1,0>	20		Chromatic tetrachord	8-4A
4-5A	[0,1,2,6]	<2,1,0,1,1,1>	22		...	8-5B
4-5B	[0,4,5,6]	<2,1,0,1,1,1>	22		...	8-5A
4-6	[0,1,2,7]	<2,1,0,0,2,1>	6		Dream chord	8-6
4-7	[0,1,4,5]	<2,0,1,2,1,0>	8		Hijaz tetrachord	8-7
4-8	[0,1,5,6]	<2,0,0,1,2,1>	10		...	8-8
4-9	[0,1,6,7]	<2,0,0,0,2,2>	2		Distance model, Pajara tetratonic	8-9
4-10	[0,2,3,5]	<1,2,2,0,1,0>	3		Nahawand tetrachord	8-10
4-11A	[0,1,3,5]	<1,2,1,1,1,0>	26		Kurd tetrachord	8-11B
4-11B	[0,2,4,5]	<1,2,1,1,1,0>	26		Diatonic tetrachord	8-11A
4-12A	[0,2,3,6]	<1,1,2,1,0,1>	28		...	8-12A
4-12B	[0,3,4,6]	<1,1,2,1,0,1>	28		...	8-12B
4-13A	[0,1,3,6]	<1,1,2,0,1,1>	7		...	8-13B
4-13B	[0,3,5,6]	<1,1,2,0,1,1>	7		...	8-13A
4-14A	[0,2,3,7]	<1,1,1,1,2,0>	25		Minor add 9 chord	8-14A
4-14B	[0,4,5,7]	<1,1,1,1,2,0>	25		Major add 4 chord	8-14B
4-Z15A	[0,1,4,6]	<1,1,1,1,1,1>	18		All-interval tetrachord	8-Z15B
4-Z15B	[0,2,5,6]	<1,1,1,1,1,1>	18		All-interval tetrachord, Hendrix chord (7 #9)	8-Z15A
4-16A	[0,1,5,7]	<1,1,0,1,2,1>	19		Major seventh flat five chord	8-16B
4-16B	[0,2,6,7]	<1,1,0,1,2,1>	19		Major 7 sus 4	8-16A
4-17	[0,3,4,7]	<1,0,2,2,1,0>	13		Alpha chord	8-17
4-18A	[0,1,4,7]	<1,0,2,1,1,1>	21		Diminished major seventh chord	8-18B
4-18B	[0,3,6,7]	<1,0,2,1,1,1>	21		...	8-18A
4-19A	[0,1,4,8]	<1,0,1,3,1,0>	24		Minor major seventh chord	8-19B
4-19B	[0,3,4,8]	<1,0,1,3,1,0>	24		Augmented major seventh chord	8-19A
4-20	[0,1,5,8]	<1,0,1,2,2,0>	15		Major seventh chord, minor flat sixth chord	8-20
4-21	[0,2,4,6]	<0,3,0,2,0,1>	11		...	8-21
4-22A	[0,2,4,7]	<0,2,1,1,2,0>	27		Mu chord	8-22B
4-22B	[0,3,5,7]	<0,2,1,1,2,0>	27		...	8-22A
4-23	[0,2,5,7]	<0,2,1,0,3,0>	4		Quartal chord, seventh suspension four chord	8-23
4-24	[0,2,4,8]	<0,2,0,3,0,1>	16		Augmented seventh chord	8-24
4-25	[0,2,6,8]	<0,2,0,2,0,2>	12		Dominant seventh flat five chord, French sixth chord	8-25
4-26	[0,3,5,8]	<0,1,2,1,2,0>	14		Minor seventh chord	8-26
4-27A	[0,2,5,8]	<0,1,2,1,1,1>	29		Half-diminished seventh chord, minor sixth chord, Tristan chord	8-27B
4-27B	[0,3,6,8]	<0,1,2,1,1,1>	29		Dominant seventh chord, German sixth chord, harmonic seventh chord	8-27A
4-28	[0,3,6,9]	<0,0,4,0,0,2>	5		Diminished seventh chord	8-28
4-Z29A	[0,1,3,7]	<1,1,1,1,1,1>	23		All-interval tetrachord, dominant thirteenth chord	8-Z29B
4-Z29B	[0,4,6,7]	<1,1,1,1,1,1>	23		All-interval tetrachord	8-Z29A
5-1	[0,1,2,3,4]	<4,3,2,1,0,0>			Chromatic pentachord	7-1
5-2A	[0,1,2,3,5]	<3,3,2,1,1,0>			...	7-2B
5-2B	[0,2,3,4,5]	<3,3,2,1,1,0>			...	7-2A
5-3A	[0,1,2,4,5]	<3,2,2,2,1,0>			...	7-3B
5-3B	[0,1,3,4,5]	<3,2,2,2,1,0>			...	7-3A
5-4A	[0,1,2,3,6]	<3,2,2,1,1,1>			...	7-4B
5-4B	[0,3,4,5,6]	<3,2,2,1,1,1>			...	7-4A
5-5A	[0,1,2,3,7]	<3,2,1,1,2,1>			...	7-5B
5-5B	[0,4,5,6,7]	<3,2,1,1,2,1>			...	7-5A
5-6A	[0,1,2,5,6]	<3,1,1,2,2,1>			...	7-6B
5-6B	[0,1,4,5,6]	<3,1,1,2,2,1>			...	7-6A
5-7A	[0,1,2,6,7]	<3,1,0,1,3,2>			...	7-7B
5-7B	[0,1,5,6,7]	<3,1,0,1,3,2>			...	7-7A
5-8	[0,2,3,4,6]	<2,3,2,2,0,1>			...	7-8
5-9A	[0,1,2,4,6]	<2,3,1,2,1,1>			...	7-9B
5-9B	[0,2,4,5,6]	<2,3,1,2,1,1>			...	7-9A
5-10A	[0,1,3,4,6]	<2,2,3,1,1,1>			...	7-10B
5-10B	[0,2,3,5,6]	<2,2,3,1,1,1>			...	7-10A
5-11A	[0,2,3,4,7]	<2,2,2,2,2,0>			...	7-11A
5-11B	[0,3,4,5,7]	<2,2,2,2,2,0>			...	7-11B
5-Z12	[0,1,3,5,6]	<2,2,2,1,2,1>			...	7-Z12
5-13A	[0,1,2,4,8]	<2,2,1,3,1,1>			...	7-13B
5-13B	[0,2,3,4,8]	<2,2,1,3,1,1>			...	7-13A
5-14A	[0,1,2,5,7]	<2,2,1,1,3,1>			...	7-14B
5-14B	[0,2,5,6,7]	<2,2,1,1,3,1>			...	7-14A
5-15	[0,1,2,6,8]	<2,2,0,2,2,2>			...	7-15
5-16A	[0,1,3,4,7]	<2,1,3,2,1,1>			Dominant 13♭9 chord	7-16B
5-16B	[0,3,4,6,7]	<2,1,3,2,1,1>			...	7-16A
5-Z17	[0,1,3,4,8]	<2,1,2,3,2,0>			Farben chord, minor major ninth chord	7-Z17
5-Z18A	[0,1,4,5,7]	<2,1,2,2,2,1>			...	7-Z18B
5-Z18B	[0,2,3,6,7]	<2,1,2,2,2,1>			...	7-Z18A
5-19A	[0,1,3,6,7]	<2,1,2,1,2,2>			...	7-19B
5-19B	[0,1,4,6,7]	<2,1,2,1,2,2>			...	7-19A
5-20A	[0,1,5,6,8] (Note: Forte 5-20A: [0,1,3,7,8])	<2,1,1,2,3,1>			Ryukyu scale	7-20B
5-20B	[0,2,3,7,8] (Note: Forte 5-20B: [0,1,5,7,8])	<2,1,1,2,3,1>			Hirajōshi scale, in scale, iwato scale	7-20A
5-21A	[0,1,4,5,8]	<2,0,2,4,2,0>			Hexatonic pentachord	7-21B
5-21B	[0,3,4,7,8]	<2,0,2,4,2,0>			Hexatonic pentachord	7-21A
5-22	[0,1,4,7,8]	<2,0,2,3,2,1>			...	7-22
5-23A	[0,2,3,5,7]	<1,3,2,1,3,0>			Aeolian pentachord	7-23B
5-23B	[0,2,4,5,7]	<1,3,2,1,3,0>			Ionian pentachord	7-23A
5-24A	[0,1,3,5,7]	<1,3,1,2,2,1>			Dominant ninth add 13 chord, Phrygian pentachord	7-24B
5-24B	[0,2,4,6,7]	<1,3,1,2,2,1>			Lydian pentachord	7-24A
5-25A	[0,2,3,5,8]	<1,2,3,1,2,1>			Half-diminished minor ninth chord	7-25B
5-25B	[0,3,5,6,8]	<1,2,3,1,2,1>			Seven six chord	7-25A
5-26A	[0,2,4,5,8]	<1,2,2,3,1,1>			Half-diminished ninth chord	7-26A
5-26B	[0,3,4,6,8]	<1,2,2,3,1,1>			Augmented major ninth chord	7-26B
5-27A	[0,1,3,5,8]	<1,2,2,2,3,0>			Major ninth chord	7-27B
5-27B	[0,3,5,7,8]	<1,2,2,2,3,0>			Minor ninth chord	7-27A
5-28A	[0,2,3,6,8]	<1,2,2,2,1,2>			...	7-28A
5-28B	[0,2,5,6,8]	<1,2,2,2,1,2>			...	7-28B
5-29A	[0,1,3,6,8]	<1,2,2,1,3,1>			...	7-29B
5-29B	[0,2,5,7,8]	<1,2,2,1,3,1>			Insen scale, minor sixth ninth chord	7-29A
5-30A	[0,1,4,6,8]	<1,2,1,3,2,1>			...	7-30B
5-30B	[0,2,4,7,8]	<1,2,1,3,2,1>			Jazz sus chord, Lydian augmented chord	7-30A
5-31A	[0,1,3,6,9]	<1,1,4,1,1,2>			Beta chord, diminished minor ninth chord	7-31B
5-31B	[0,2,3,6,9]	<1,1,4,1,1,2>			Diminished ninth chord, dominant minor ninth chord	7-31A
5-32A	[0,1,4,6,9]	<1,1,3,2,2,1>			...	7-32B
5-32B	[0,2,5,6,9] (Note: Forte 5-32B: [0,1,4,7,9])	<1,1,3,2,2,1>			Dominant seventh sharp ninth chord, Elektra chord, gamma chord	7-32A
5-33	[0,2,4,6,8]	<0,4,0,4,0,2>			Augmented dominant ninth chord, ninth augmented fifth chord, ninth flat fifth chord	7-33
5-34	[0,2,4,6,9]	<0,3,2,2,2,1>			Dominant ninth chord	7-34
5-35	[0,2,4,7,9]	<0,3,2,1,4,0>			Major pentatonic scale	7-35
5-Z36A	[0,1,2,4,7]	<2,2,2,1,2,1>			...	7-Z36B
5-Z36B	[0,3,5,6,7]	<2,2,2,1,2,1>			...	7-Z36A
5-Z37	[0,3,4,5,8]	<2,1,2,3,2,0>			...	7-Z37
5-Z38A	[0,1,2,5,8]	<2,1,2,2,2,1>			...	7-Z38B
5-Z38B	[0,3,6,7,8]	<2,1,2,2,2,1>			...	7-Z38A
6-1	[0,1,2,3,4,5]	<5,4,3,2,1,0>	4		Chromatic hexachord	6-1
6-2A	[0,1,2,3,4,6]	<4,4,3,2,1,1>	19		...	6-2B
6-2B	[0,2,3,4,5,6]	<4,4,3,2,1,1>	19		...	6-2A
6-Z3A	[0,1,2,3,5,6]	<4,3,3,2,2,1>	49		...	6-Z36B
6-Z3B	[0,1,3,4,5,6]	<4,3,3,2,2,1>	49		...	6-Z36A
6-Z4	[0,1,2,4,5,6]	<4,3,2,3,2,1>	24		...	6-Z37
6-5A	[0,1,2,3,6,7]	<4,2,2,2,3,2>	16		...	6-5B
6-5B	[0,1,4,5,6,7]	<4,2,2,2,3,2>	16		...	6-5A
6-Z6	[0,1,2,5,6,7]	<4,2,1,2,4,2>	33		...	6-Z38
6-7	[0,1,2,6,7,8]	<4,2,0,2,4,3>	7		Two-semitone tritone scale; Messiaen mode	6-7
6-8	[0,2,3,4,5,7]	<3,4,3,2,3,0>	5		...	6-8
6-9A	[0,1,2,3,5,7]	<3,4,2,2,3,1>	20		...	6-9B
6-9B	[0,2,4,5,6,7]	<3,4,2,2,3,1>	20		...	6-9A
6-Z10A	[0,1,3,4,5,7]	<3,3,3,3,2,1>	42		...	6-Z39A
6-Z10B	[0,2,3,4,6,7]	<3,3,3,3,2,1>	42		...	6-Z39B
6-Z11A	[0,1,2,4,5,7]	<3,3,3,2,3,1>	47		...	6-Z40B
6-Z11B	[0,2,3,5,6,7]	<3,3,3,2,3,1>	47		Sacher hexachord	6-Z40A
6-Z12A	[0,1,2,4,6,7]	<3,3,2,2,3,2>	46		...	6-Z41B
6-Z12B	[0,1,3,5,6,7]	<3,3,2,2,3,2>	46		...	6-Z41A
6-Z13	[0,1,3,4,6,7]	<3,2,4,2,2,2>	29		Istrian scale	6-Z42
6-14A	[0,1,3,4,5,8]	<3,2,3,4,3,0>	3		...	6-14A
6-14B	[0,3,4,5,7,8]	<3,2,3,4,3,0>	3		...	6-14B
6-15A	[0,1,2,4,5,8]	<3,2,3,4,2,1>	13		...	6-15B
6-15B	[0,3,4,6,7,8]	<3,2,3,4,2,1>	13		...	6-15A
6-16A	[0,1,4,5,6,8]	<3,2,2,4,3,1>	11		...	6-16B
6-16B	[0,2,3,4,7,8]	<3,2,2,4,3,1>	11		...	6-16A
6-Z17A	[0,1,2,4,7,8]	<3,2,2,3,3,2>	35		All-trichord hexachord	6-Z43B
6-Z17B	[0,1,4,6,7,8]	<3,2,2,3,3,2>	35		...	6-Z43A
6-18A	[0,1,2,5,7,8]	<3,2,2,2,4,2>	17		...	6-18B
6-18B	[0,1,3,6,7,8]	<3,2,2,2,4,2>	17		...	6-18A
6-Z19A	[0,1,3,4,7,8]	<3,1,3,4,3,1>	37		Schoenberg hexachord; two minor triads a semitone apart	6-Z44B
6-Z19B	[0,1,4,5,7,8]	<3,1,3,4,3,1>	37		Inverted Schoenberg hexachord; two major triads a semitone apart	6-Z44A
6-20	[0,1,4,5,8,9]	<3,0,3,6,3,0>	2		Hexatonic mode, "Ode-to-Napoleon" hexachord	6-20
6-21A	[0,2,3,4,6,8]	<2,4,2,4,1,2>	12		...	6-21B
6-21B	[0,2,4,5,6,8]	<2,4,2,4,1,2>	12		...	6-21A
6-22A	[0,1,2,4,6,8]	<2,4,1,4,2,2>	10		...	6-22B
6-22B	[0,2,4,6,7,8]	<2,4,1,4,2,2>	10		...	6-22A
6-Z23	[0,2,3,5,6,8]	<2,3,4,2,2,2>	27		...	6-Z45
6-Z24A	[0,1,3,4,6,8]	<2,3,3,3,3,1>	39		Minor major eleventh chord	6-Z46B
6-Z24B	[0,2,4,5,7,8]	<2,3,3,3,3,1>	39		Half-diminished eleventh chord	6-Z46A
6-Z25A	[0,1,3,5,6,8]	<2,3,3,2,4,1>	43		Major eleventh chord	6-Z47B
6-Z25B	[0,2,3,5,7,8]	<2,3,3,2,4,1>	43		...	6-Z47A
6-Z26	[0,1,3,5,7,8]	<2,3,2,3,4,1>	26		Major ninth sharp eleventh chord	6-Z48
6-27A	[0,1,3,4,6,9]	<2,2,5,2,2,2>	14		...	6-27B
6-27B	[0,2,3,5,6,9]	<2,2,5,2,2,2>	14		Diminished eleventh chord	6-27A
6-Z28	[0,1,3,5,6,9]	<2,2,4,3,2,2>	21		Augmented major eleventh chord	6-Z49
6-Z29	[0,2,3,6,7,9] (Note: Forte 6-Z29: [0,1,3,6,8,9])	<2,2,4,2,3,2>	32		Bridge chord	6-Z50
6-30A	[0,1,3,6,7,9]	<2,2,4,2,2,3>	15		...	6-30B
6-30B	[0,2,3,6,8,9]	<2,2,4,2,2,3>	15		Petrushka chord, tritone scale	6-30A
6-31A	[0,1,4,5,7,9] (Note: Forte 6-31A: [0,1,3,5,8,9])	<2,2,3,4,3,1>	8		...	6-31B
6-31B	[0,2,4,5,8,9] (Note: Forte 6-31B: [0,1,4,6,8,9])	<2,2,3,4,3,1>	8		...	6-31A
6-32	[0,2,4,5,7,9]	<1,4,3,2,5,0>	6		Diatonic hexachord, minor eleventh chord	6-32
6-33A	[0,2,3,5,7,9]	<1,4,3,2,4,1>	18		Dominant 9 add 13	6-33B
6-33B	[0,2,4,6,7,9]	<1,4,3,2,4,1>	18		Dominant eleventh chord	6-33A
6-34A	[0,1,3,5,7,9]	<1,4,2,4,2,2>	9		Mystic chord	6-34B
6-34B	[0,2,4,6,8,9]	<1,4,2,4,2,2>	9		Augmented eleventh chord, dominant sharp eleventh chord, Prélude chord	6-34A
6-35	[0,2,4,6,8,T]	<0,6,0,6,0,3>	1		Whole tone scale	6-35
6-Z36A	[0,1,2,3,4,7]	<4,3,3,2,2,1>	50		...	6-Z3B
6-Z36B	[0,3,4,5,6,7]	<4,3,3,2,2,1>	50		...	6-Z3A
6-Z37	[0,1,2,3,4,8]	<4,3,2,3,2,1>	23		...	6-Z4
6-Z38	[0,1,2,3,7,8]	<4,2,1,2,4,2>	34		"Lulu" hexachord variant; two suspended triads a semitone apart	6-Z6
6-Z39A	[0,2,3,4,5,8]	<3,3,3,3,2,1>	41		...	6-Z10A
6-Z39B	[0,3,4,5,6,8]	<3,3,3,3,2,1>	41		...	6-Z10B
6-Z40A	[0,1,2,3,5,8]	<3,3,3,2,3,1>	48		...	6-Z11B
6-Z40B	[0,3,5,6,7,8]	<3,3,3,2,3,1>	48		...	6-Z11A
6-Z41A	[0,1,2,3,6,8]	<3,3,2,2,3,2>	45		...	6-Z12B
6-Z41B	[0,2,5,6,7,8]	<3,3,2,2,3,2>	45		...	6-Z12A
6-Z42	[0,1,2,3,6,9]	<3,2,4,2,2,2>	30		...	6-Z13
6-Z43A	[0,1,2,5,6,8]	<3,2,2,3,3,2>	36		...	6-Z17B
6-Z43B	[0,2,3,6,7,8]	<3,2,2,3,3,2>	36		...	6-Z17A
6-Z44A	[0,1,2,5,6,9]	<3,1,3,4,3,1>	38		...	6-Z19B
6-Z44B	[0,1,4,5,6,9] (Note: Forte 6-Z44B: [0,1,2,5,8,9])	<3,1,3,4,3,1>	38		...	6-Z19A
6-Z45	[0,2,3,4,6,9]	<2,3,4,2,2,2>	28		...	6-Z23
6-Z46A	[0,1,2,4,6,9]	<2,3,3,3,3,1>	40		Scale of harmonics	6-Z24B
6-Z46B	[0,2,4,5,6,9]	<2,3,3,3,3,1>	40		...	6-Z24A
6-Z47A	[0,1,2,4,7,9]	<2,3,3,2,4,1>	44		...	6-Z25B
6-Z47B	[0,2,3,4,7,9]	<2,3,3,2,4,1>	44		Blues scale	6-Z25A
6-Z48	[0,1,2,5,7,9]	<2,3,2,3,4,1>	25		...	6-Z26
6-Z49	[0,1,3,4,7,9]	<2,2,4,3,2,2>	22		Octatonic hexachord	6-Z28
6-Z50	[0,1,4,6,7,9]	<2,2,4,2,3,2>	31		...	6-Z29
7-1	[0,1,2,3,4,5,6]	<6,5,4,3,2,1>	1		Chromatic heptachord	5-1
7-2A	[0,1,2,3,4,5,7]	<5,5,4,3,3,1>	11		...	5-2B
7-2B	[0,2,3,4,5,6,7]	<5,5,4,3,3,1>	11		...	5-2A
7-3A	[0,1,2,3,4,5,8]	<5,4,4,4,3,1>	14		...	5-3B
7-3B	[0,3,4,5,6,7,8]	<5,4,4,4,3,1>	14		...	5-3A
7-4A	[0,1,2,3,4,6,7]	<5,4,4,3,3,2>	12		...	5-4B
7-4B	[0,1,3,4,5,6,7]	<5,4,4,3,3,2>	12		...	5-4A
7-5A	[0,1,2,3,5,6,7]	<5,4,3,3,4,2>	13		...	5-5B
7-5B	[0,1,2,4,5,6,7]	<5,4,3,3,4,2>	13		...	5-5A
7-6A	[0,1,2,3,4,7,8]	<5,3,3,4,4,2>	27		...	5-6B
7-6B	[0,1,4,5,6,7,8]	<5,3,3,4,4,2>	27		...	5-6A
7-7A	[0,1,2,3,6,7,8]	<5,3,2,3,5,3>	30		...	5-7B
7-7B	[0,1,2,5,6,7,8]	<5,3,2,3,5,3>	30		...	5-7A
7-8	[0,2,3,4,5,6,8]	<4,5,4,4,2,2>	2		...	5-8
7-9A	[0,1,2,3,4,6,8]	<4,5,3,4,3,2>	15		...	5-9B
7-9B	[0,2,4,5,6,7,8]	<4,5,3,4,3,2>	15		...	5-9A
7-10A	[0,1,2,3,4,6,9]	<4,4,5,3,3,2>	19		...	5-10B
7-10B	[0,2,3,4,5,6,9]	<4,4,5,3,3,2>	19		...	5-10A
7-11A	[0,1,3,4,5,6,8]	<4,4,4,4,4,1>	18		...	5-11A
7-11B	[0,2,3,4,5,7,8]	<4,4,4,4,4,1>	18		...	5-11B
7-Z12	[0,1,2,3,4,7,9]	<4,4,4,3,4,2>	5		...	5-Z12
7-13A	[0,1,2,4,5,6,8]	<4,4,3,5,3,2>	17		...	5-13B
7-13B	[0,2,3,4,6,7,8]	<4,4,3,5,3,2>	17		...	5-13A
7-14A	[0,1,2,3,5,7,8]	<4,4,3,3,5,2>	28		...	5-14B
7-14B	[0,1,3,5,6,7,8]	<4,4,3,3,5,2>	28		...	5-14A
7-15	[0,1,2,4,6,7,8]	<4,4,2,4,4,3>	4		...	5-15
7-16A	[0,1,2,3,5,6,9]	<4,3,5,4,3,2>	20		...	5-16B
7-16B	[0,1,3,4,5,6,9]	<4,3,5,4,3,2>	20		...	5-16A
7-Z17	[0,1,2,4,5,6,9]	<4,3,4,5,4,1>	10		...	5-Z17
7-Z18A	[0,1,4,5,6,7,9] (Note: Forte 7-Z18A: [0,1,2,3,5,8,9])	<4,3,4,4,4,2>	35		...	5-Z18B
7-Z18B	[0,2,3,4,5,8,9] (Note: Forte 7-Z18B: [0,1,4,6,7,8,9])	<4,3,4,4,4,2>	35		...	5-Z18A
7-19A	[0,1,2,3,6,7,9]	<4,3,4,3,4,3>	31		...	5-19B
7-19B	[0,1,2,3,6,8,9]	<4,3,4,3,4,3>	31		...	5-19A
7-20A	[0,1,2,5,6,7,9] (Note: Forte 7-20A: [0,1,2,4,7,8,9])	<4,3,3,4,5,2>	34		Persian scale	5-20B
7-20B	[0,2,3,4,7,8,9] (Note: Forte 7-20B: [0,1,2,5,7,8,9])	<4,3,3,4,5,2>	34		Heptatonic blues scale	5-20A
7-21A	[0,1,2,4,5,8,9]	<4,2,4,6,4,1>	21		...	5-21B
7-21B	[0,1,3,4,5,8,9]	<4,2,4,6,4,1>	21		...	5-21A
7-22	[0,1,2,5,6,8,9]	<4,2,4,5,4,2>	8		Double harmonic scale, Hungarian minor scale	5-22
7-23A	[0,2,3,4,5,7,9]	<3,5,4,3,5,1>	25		...	5-23B
7-23B	[0,2,4,5,6,7,9]	<3,5,4,3,5,1>	25		...	5-23A
7-24A	[0,1,2,3,5,7,9]	<3,5,3,4,4,2>	22		...	5-24B
7-24B	[0,2,4,6,7,8,9]	<3,5,3,4,4,2>	22		Enigmatic scale	5-24A
7-25A	[0,2,3,4,6,7,9]	<3,4,5,3,4,2>	24		...	5-25B
7-25B	[0,2,3,5,6,7,9]	<3,4,5,3,4,2>	24		...	5-25A
7-26A	[0,1,3,4,5,7,9]	<3,4,4,5,3,2>	26		...	5-26A
7-26B	[0,2,4,5,6,8,9]	<3,4,4,5,3,2>	26		...	5-26B
7-27A	[0,1,2,4,5,7,9]	<3,4,4,4,5,1>	23		...	5-27B
7-27B	[0,2,4,5,7,8,9]	<3,4,4,4,5,1>	23		...	5-27A
7-28A	[0,1,3,5,6,7,9]	<3,4,4,4,3,3>	36		Harmonic Locrian major scale	5-28A
7-28B	[0,2,3,4,6,8,9]	<3,4,4,4,3,3>	36		...	5-28B
7-29A	[0,1,2,4,6,7,9]	<3,4,4,3,5,2>	32		...	5-29B
7-29B	[0,2,3,5,7,8,9]	<3,4,4,3,5,2>	32		...	5-29A
7-30A	[0,1,2,4,6,8,9]	<3,4,3,5,4,2>	37		Augmented thirteenth chord, minor Neapolitan scale	5-30B
7-30B	[0,1,3,5,7,8,9]	<3,4,3,5,4,2>	37		Harmonic Lydian scale	5-30A
7-31A	[0,1,3,4,6,7,9]	<3,3,6,3,3,3>	38		Hungarian major scale	5-31B
7-31B	[0,2,3,5,6,8,9]	<3,3,6,3,3,3>	38		Romanian major scale	5-31A
7-32A	[0,1,3,4,6,8,9]	<3,3,5,4,4,2>	33		Augmented major thirteenth chord, harmonic minor scale, Ukrainian Dorian scale	5-32B
7-32B	[0,1,3,5,6,8,9]	<3,3,5,4,4,2>	33		Half-diminished thirteenth chord, harmonic major scale	5-32A
7-33	[0,1,2,4,6,8,T]	<2,6,2,6,2,3>	6		Major Locrian scale, major Neapolitan scale, melodic Phrygian scale	5-33
7-34	[0,1,3,4,6,8,T]	<2,5,4,4,4,2>	9		Acoustic scale, altered scale, minor major thirteenth chord	5-34
7-35	[0,1,3,5,6,8,T]	<2,5,4,3,6,1>	7		Diatonic scale, major thirteenth chord, minor thirteenth chord	5-35
7-Z36A	[0,1,2,3,5,6,8]	<4,4,4,3,4,2>	16		...	5-Z36B
7-Z36B	[0,2,3,5,6,7,8]	<4,4,4,3,4,2>	16		...	5-Z36A
7-Z37	[0,1,3,4,5,7,8]	<4,3,4,5,4,1>	3		...	5-Z37
7-Z38A	[0,1,2,4,5,7,8]	<4,3,4,4,4,2>	29		...	5-Z38B
7-Z38B	[0,1,3,4,6,7,8]	<4,3,4,4,4,2>	29		...	5-Z38A
8-1	[0,1,2,3,4,5,6,7]	<7,6,5,4,4,2>			...	4-1
8-2A	[0,1,2,3,4,5,6,8]	<6,6,5,5,4,2>			...	4-2B
8-2B	[0,2,3,4,5,6,7,8]	<6,6,5,5,4,2>			...	4-2A
8-3	[0,1,2,3,4,5,6,9]	<6,5,6,5,4,2>			...	4-3
8-4A	[0,1,2,3,4,5,7,8]	<6,5,5,5,5,2>			...	4-4B
8-4B	[0,1,3,4,5,6,7,8]	<6,5,5,5,5,2>			...	4-4A
8-5A	[0,1,2,3,4,6,7,8]	<6,5,4,5,5,3>			...	4-5B
8-5B	[0,1,2,4,5,6,7,8]	<6,5,4,5,5,3>			...	4-5A
8-6	[0,1,2,3,5,6,7,8]	<6,5,4,4,6,3>			...	4-6
8-7	[0,1,2,3,4,5,8,9]	<6,4,5,6,5,2>			...	4-7
8-8	[0,1,2,3,4,7,8,9]	<6,4,4,5,6,3>			...	4-8
8-9	[0,1,2,3,6,7,8,9]	<6,4,4,4,6,4>			...	4-9
8-10	[0,2,3,4,5,6,7,9]	<5,6,6,4,5,2>			...	4-10
8-11A	[0,1,2,3,4,5,7,9]	<5,6,5,5,5,2>			...	4-11B
8-11B	[0,2,4,5,6,7,8,9]	<5,6,5,5,5,2>			...	4-11A
8-12A	[0,1,3,4,5,6,7,9]	<5,5,6,5,4,3>			...	4-12A
8-12B	[0,2,3,4,5,6,8,9]	<5,5,6,5,4,3>			...	4-12B
8-13A	[0,1,2,3,4,6,7,9]	<5,5,6,4,5,3>			...	4-13B
8-13B	[0,2,3,5,6,7,8,9]	<5,5,6,4,5,3>			...	4-13A
8-14A	[0,1,2,4,5,6,7,9]	<5,5,5,5,6,2>			...	4-14A
8-14B	[0,2,3,4,5,7,8,9]	<5,5,5,5,6,2>			...	4-14B
8-Z15A	[0,1,2,3,4,6,8,9]	<5,5,5,5,5,3>			...	4-Z15B
8-Z15B	[0,1,3,5,6,7,8,9]	<5,5,5,5,5,3>			...	4-Z15A
8-16A	[0,1,2,3,5,7,8,9]	<5,5,4,5,6,3>			...	4-16B
8-16B	[0,1,2,4,6,7,8,9]	<5,5,4,5,6,3>			...	4-16A
8-17	[0,1,3,4,5,6,8,9]	<5,4,6,6,5,2>			...	4-17
8-18A	[0,1,2,3,5,6,8,9]	<5,4,6,5,5,3>			...	4-18B
8-18B	[0,1,3,4,6,7,8,9]	<5,4,6,5,5,3>			...	4-18A
8-19A	[0,1,2,4,5,6,8,9]	<5,4,5,7,5,2>			...	4-19B
8-19B	[0,1,3,4,5,7,8,9]	<5,4,5,7,5,2>			...	4-19A
8-20	[0,1,2,4,5,7,8,9]	<5,4,5,6,6,2>			...	4-20
8-21	[0,1,2,3,4,6,8,T]	<4,7,4,6,4,3>			...	4-21
8-22A	[0,1,2,3,5,6,8,T]	<4,6,5,5,6,2>			...	4-22B
8-22B	[0,1,3,4,5,6,8,T] (Note: Forte 8-22B: [0,1,2,3,5,7,9,T])	<4,6,5,5,6,2>			...	4-22A
8-23	[0,1,2,3,5,7,8,T]	<4,6,5,4,7,2>			Bebop dominant scale, bebop major scale	4-23
8-24	[0,1,2,4,5,6,8,T]	<4,6,4,7,4,3>			...	4-24
8-25	[0,1,2,4,6,7,8,T]	<4,6,4,6,4,4>			Seventh flat five diminished scale	4-25
8-26	[0,1,3,4,5,7,8,T] (Note: Forte 8-26: [0,1,2,4,5,7,9,T])	<4,5,6,5,6,2>			Bebop harmonic minor scale	4-26
8-27A	[0,1,2,4,5,7,8,T]	<4,5,6,5,5,3>			...	4-27B
8-27B	[0,1,3,4,6,7,8,T] (Note: Forte 8-27B: [0,1,2,4,6,7,9,T])	<4,5,6,5,5,3>			Bebop melodic minor scale	4-27A
8-28	[0,1,3,4,6,7,9,T]	<4,4,8,4,4,4>			Octatonic scale	4-28
8-Z29A	[0,1,2,3,5,6,7,9]	<5,5,5,5,5,3>			...	4-Z29B
8-Z29B	[0,2,3,4,6,7,8,9]	<5,5,5,5,5,3>			...	4-Z29A
9-1	[0,1,2,3,4,5,6,7,8]	<8,7,6,6,6,3>			...	3-1
9-2A	[0,1,2,3,4,5,6,7,9]	<7,7,7,6,6,3>			...	3-2B
9-2B	[0,2,3,4,5,6,7,8,9]	<7,7,7,6,6,3>			...	3-2A
9-3A	[0,1,2,3,4,5,6,8,9]	<7,6,7,7,6,3>			...	3-3B
9-3B	[0,1,3,4,5,6,7,8,9]	<7,6,7,7,6,3>			...	3-3A
9-4A	[0,1,2,3,4,5,7,8,9]	<7,6,6,7,7,3>			...	3-4B
9-4B	[0,1,2,4,5,6,7,8,9]	<7,6,6,7,7,3>			...	3-4A
9-5A	[0,1,2,3,4,6,7,8,9]	<7,6,6,6,7,4>			...	3-5B
9-5B	[0,1,2,3,5,6,7,8,9]	<7,6,6,6,7,4>			...	3-5A
9-6	[0,1,2,3,4,5,6,8,T]	<6,8,6,7,6,3>			...	3-6
9-7A	[0,1,2,3,4,5,7,8,T]	<6,7,7,6,7,3>			...	3-7B
9-7B	[0,1,3,4,5,6,7,8,T] (Note: Forte 9-7B: [0,1,2,3,4,5,7,9,T])	<6,7,7,6,7,3>			...	3-7A
9-8A	[0,1,2,3,4,6,7,8,T]	<6,7,6,7,6,4>			...	3-8B
9-8B	[0,1,2,4,5,6,7,8,T] (Note: Forte 9-8B: [0,1,2,3,4,6,8,9,T])	<6,7,6,7,6,4>			Mahler 10 chord	3-8A
9-9	[0,1,2,3,5,6,7,8,T]	<6,7,6,6,8,3>			Blues scale	3-9
9-10	[0,1,2,3,4,6,7,9,T]	<6,6,8,6,6,4>			...	3-10
9-11A	[0,1,2,3,5,6,7,9,T]	<6,6,7,7,7,3>			...	3-11B
9-11B	[0,1,2,4,5,6,7,9,T] (Note: Forte 9-11B: [0,1,2,3,5,6,8,9,T])	<6,6,7,7,7,3>			...	3-11A
9-12	[0,1,2,4,5,6,8,9,T]	<6,6,6,9,6,3>			Messiaen's third mode (enneatonic/hyper-hexatonic)	3-12
10-1	[0,1,2,3,4,5,6,7,8,9]	<9,8,8,8,8,4>			...	2-1
10-2	[0,1,2,3,4,5,6,7,8,T]	<8,9,8,8,8,4>			...	2-2
10-3	[0,1,2,3,4,5,6,7,9,T]	<8,8,9,8,8,4>			...	2-3
10-4	[0,1,2,3,4,5,6,8,9,T]	<8,8,8,9,8,4>			...	2-4
10-5	[0,1,2,3,4,5,7,8,9,T]	<8,8,8,8,9,4>			...	2-5
10-6	[0,1,2,3,4,6,7,8,9,T]	<8,8,8,8,8,5>			Messiaen's seventh mode	2-6
11-1	[0,1,2,3,4,5,6,7,8,9,T]	<T,T,T,T,T,5>			Northern lights chord	1-1
12-1	[0,1,2,3,4,5,6,7,8,9,T,E]	<C,C,C,C,C,6>			Aggregate, all-interval twelve-tone row	0-1

== See also ==
- Interval vector
- List of chords
- Z-relation
