= List of chords =

The following is a list of musical chords and simultaneities:

Code	Chord type
Major	Major chord
Minor	Minor chord
Augmented	Augmented chord
Diminished	Diminished chord
Indeterminate	Indeterminate chord
Predominant	Predominant chord
Suspended	Suspended chord
M3+b5	Major third, flat five
Just	Just intonation
Bitonal	Bitonal chord
Atonal	Atonal chord

List of musical chords
Name	Chord on C	Sound	# of p.c.-Forte #	p.c. #s	Quality
Augmented chord			3-12	0 4 8	Augmented
Augmented eleventh chord			6-34B	0 4 7 t 2 6	Major
Augmented major seventh chord			4-19B	0 4 8 e	Augmented
Augmented seventh chord			4-24	0 4 8 t	Augmented
Augmented sixth chord			3-8A; 4-25; 4-27B	0 4 t 0 4 6 t 0 4 7 t	Predominant
Diminished chord			3-10	0 3 6	Diminished
Diminished major seventh chord			4-18A	0 3 6 e	Diminished
Diminished seventh chord (leading-tone and secondary chord)			4-28	0 3 6 9	Diminished
Dominant			3-11B	0 4 7	Major
Dominant eleventh chord			6-33B	0 4 7 t 2 5	Major
Dominant minor ninth			5-31A	0 4 7 t 1	Major
Dominant ninth			5-34	0 4 7 t 2	Major
Dominant parallel			3-11A	0 3 7	Minor
Dominant seventh chord			4-27B	0 4 7 t	Major
Dominant seventh flat five chord			4-25	0 4 6 t	Diminished
Dominant seventh sharp nine / Hendrix chord			5-32B	0 4 7 t 3	Major
Dominant thirteenth chord			7-35	0 4 7 t 2 5 9	Major
Dream chord			4-6	0 5 6 7	Just
Elektra chord			5-32B	0 7 9 1 4	Bitonal
Farben chord			5-Z17	0 8 e 4 9	Atonal
Half-diminished seventh chord			4-27A	0 3 6 t	Diminished
Harmonic seventh chord			4-27B	0 4 7 t	Major
Leading-tone triad			3-10	0 3 6	Diminished
Lydian chord			5-20B	0 4 7 e 6	Major
Magic chord			8	0 1 5 6 t 0 3 5	Just
Major chord			3-11B	0 4 7	Major
Major added-second chord			4-24	0 2 4 7	Major
Major eleventh chord			6-Z25A	0 4 7 e 2 5	Major
Major seventh chord			4-20	0 4 7 e	Major
Major seventh sharp eleventh chord			5-30B	0 4 8 e 6	Augmented
Major sixth chord			4-26	0 4 7 9	Major
Major sixth ninth chord ("6 add 9", Nine six, 6/9)			5-35	0 4 7 9 2	Major
Major ninth chord			5-27A	0 4 7 e 2	Major
Major thirteenth chord			7-35	0 4 7 e 2 5 9	Major
Mediant			3-11A	0 3 7	Minor
Minor chord			3-11A	0 3 7	Minor
Minor added-second chord			4-20	0 2 3 7	Minor
Minor eleventh chord			6-32	0 3 7 t 2 5	Minor
Minor major seventh chord			4-19A	0 3 7 e	Minor
Minor ninth chord			5-27B	0 3 7 t 2	Minor
Minor seventh chord			4-26	0 3 7 t	Minor
Minor sixth chord			4-27A	0 3 7 9	Minor
Minor sixth ninth chord (6/9)			5-29B	0 3 7 9 2	Minor
Minor thirteenth chord			7-35	0 3 7 t 2 5 9	Minor
Mystic chord			6-34A	0 6 t 4 9 2	Atonal
Neapolitan chord			3-11B	1 5 8	Major
Ninth augmented fifth chord			5-33	0 4 8 t 2	Augmented
Ninth flat fifth chord			5-33	0 4 6 t 2	M3+b5
Northern lights chord			11-1	1 2 8 0 3 6 7 t e 4 7	Atonal
"Ode-to-Napoleon" hexachord			6-20	0 1 4 5 8 9	Atonal
Petrushka chord			6-30B	0 1 4 6 7 t	Bitonal
Power chord P5			2-5	0 7	Indeterminate
Psalms chord			3-11A	0 3 7	Minor
Secondary dominant			3-11B	0 4 7	Major
Secondary leading-tone chord			3-10	0 3 6	Diminished
Secondary supertonic chord			3-11A	0 3 7	Minor
Seven six chord			5-25B	0 4 7 9 t	Major
Seventh suspension four chord			4-23	0 5 7 t	Suspended
So What chord			5-35	0 5 t 3 7	Bitonal
Suspended chord			3-9	0 5 7	Suspended
Subdominant			3-11B	0 4 7	Major
Subdominant parallel			3-11A	0 3 7	Minor
Submediant			3-11A	0 3 7	Minor
Subtonic			3-11B	0 4 7	Major
Supertonic			3-11A	0 3 7	Minor
Thirteenth flat ninth chord			6-27	0 4 7 t 1 x 9	Major
Thirteenth flat ninth flat fifth chord			6-Z49	0 4 6 t 1 x 9	M3+b5
Tonic counter parallel			3-11A	0 3 7	Minor
Tonic			3-11B	0 4 7	Major
Tonic parallel			3-11A	0 3 7	Minor
Tristan chord			4-27A	0 3 6 t	Predominant
Viennese trichord			3-5A; 3-5B	0 1 6; 0 6 7	Atonal

== See also ==
- Added tone chord
- Altered chord
- Approach chord
- Chord names and symbols (popular music)
- Chromatic mediant
- Common chord (music)
- Diatonic function
- Eleventh chord
- Extended chord
- Jazz chord
- Lead sheet
- List of musical intervals
- List of pitch intervals
- List of musical scales and modes
- List of set classes
- Ninth chord
- Open chord
- Passing chord
- Primary triad
- Quartal chord
- Root (chord)
- Seventh chord
- Synthetic chord
- Thirteenth chord
- Tone cluster
- Triad (music)
- Upper structure
