= Viennese trichord =

Chord

Component intervals from root
- tritone
- minor second
- root

Tuning
- 8:12:17

Forte no. / Complement
- 3-5 / 9-5

Interval vector
- <1,0,0,0,1,1>

A Viennese trichord is a group of three notes consisting of a perfect fourth and a tritone. It is also known as a Viennese fourth chord or tritone-fourth chord.

The grouping is named after the Second Viennese School. The trichord has the prime form (0,1,6). Its Forte number is 3-5. The sets C–D♭–G♭ and C–F♯–G are both examples of Viennese trichords, though they may be voiced in many ways.

When the trichord appears in works like Paul Hindemith's Ludus Tonalis, the dissonant semitone might be treated as an escape tone per traditional part writing rules. Whereas, Viennese composers like Anton Webern were partial to the trichord because of its unresolved dissonance.

The trichord appears in jazz chord voicings as the third, seventh, and eleventh of a dominant chord. When inverted, these three notes can serve as the third, seventh, and thirteenth or third, seventh, and sharpened ninth of a dominant chord or the flattened third, sixth, and ninth of a minor 6/9 chord.
