= Seven six chord =

Chord

seven six chord
Component intervals from root
- minor seventh
- major sixth
- perfect fifth
- major third
- root

Tuning
- 12:15:18:20:21

Forte no. / Complement
- 5-25 / 7-25

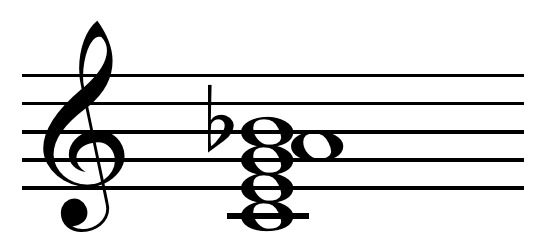
Seven six chord on C (C^{7/6}).

In music, a seven six chord is a chord containing both factors a sixth and a seventh above the root, making it both an added chord and a seventh chord. However, the term may mean the first inversion of an added ninth chord (E–G–C–D).

It can be written as 7/6 and 7,6. It can be represented by the integer notation {0, 4, 7, 9, 10}.

This is known more commonly as the 13th chord, with both the dominant 7th and the 6th (or 13th). The chord therefore contains the 5, 6, 7, & 8 (root), which can be spread or clustered. Playing the 13th note extension (or 6th) without the dominant 7th is known as an Add 6 (+6) chord.

== Six seven chord table ==
Chord	Root	Major third	Perfect fifth	Major sixth	Minor seventh
C^{7/6}	C	E	G	A	B♭
C♯^{7/6}	C♯	E♯ (F)	G♯	A♯	B
D♭^{7/6}	D♭	F	A♭	B♭	C♭
D^{7/6}	D	F♯	A	B	C
D♯^{7/6}	D♯	F (G)	A♯	B♯ (C)	C♯
E♭^{7/6}	E♭	G	B♭	C	D♭
E^{7/6}	E	G♯	B	C♯	D
F^{7/6}	F	A	C	D	E♭
F♯^{7/6}	F♯	A♯	C♯	D♯	E
G♭^{7/6}	G♭	B♭	D♭	E♭	F♭ (E)
G^{7/6}	G	B	D	E	F
G♯^{7/6}	G♯	B♯ (C)	D♯	E♯ (F)	F♯ (G♭)
A♭^{7/6}	A♭	C	E♭	F	G♭
A^{7/6}	A	C♯	E	F♯	G
A♯^{7/6}	A♯	C (D)	E♯ (F)	F (G)	G♯
B♭^{7/6}	B♭	D	F	G	A♭
B^{7/6}	B	D♯	F♯	G♯	A
