= Augmented ninth chord =

In music, augmented ninth chord may refer to:

- the Hendrix chord, a mixed-third chord: 0 4 7 t 3.
- an altered chord, an augmented triad with an added ninth: 0 4 8 t 2.
