= Bridge chord =

Bitonal chord

Component intervals from root
- major sixth
- fifth
- tritone
- minor third
- major second
- root

Tuning
- 32:36:38:45:48:54

Forte no. / Complement
- 6-z29 / 6-z50

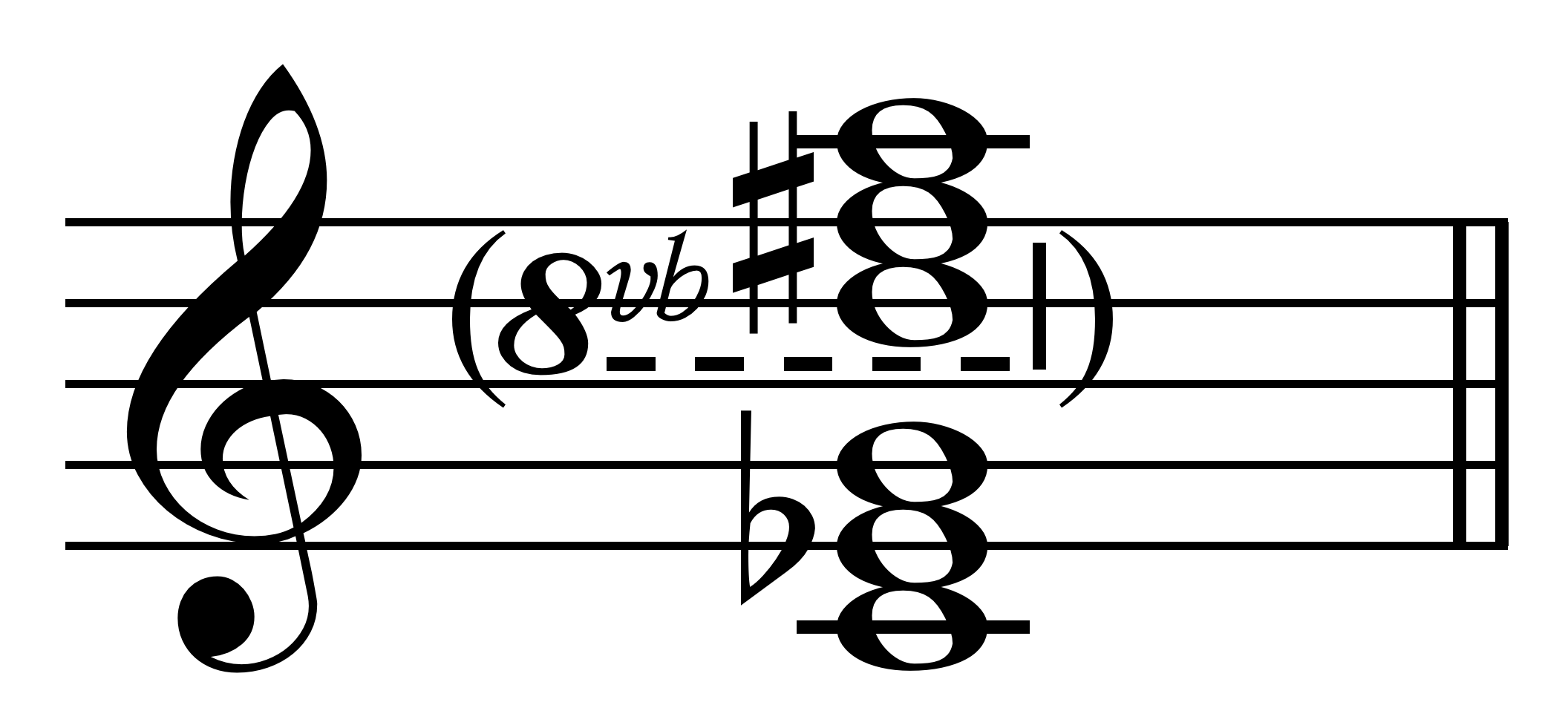
Bridge chord on C.

The Bridge chord is a bitonal chord named after its use in the music of composer Frank Bridge (1879–1941). It consists of a minor chord with the major chord a whole tone above (e.g., C–E♭–G and D–F♯–A), as well as a major chord with the minor chord a semitone above (e.g., C–E–G and D♭–F♭–A♭), which share the same mediant (E/F♭).) When inverted, both form eleventh chords (e.g., D–F♯–A–C–E♭–G = D^{11♭9} and D♭–F♭–A♭–C–E–G = D♭m^{M7A9A11}).

According to Anthony Payne, Paul Hindmarsh and Lewis Foreman, Bridge had strong pacifist convictions, and he was deeply disturbed by the First World War. The Bridge chord appears to have been introduced in the years following the War, as Bridge experimented with more prominent use of dissonance in his musical language and a more structured method of composition. Its first use in his published work is in the Piano Sonata (1921–24). The Bridge chord is fairly dissonant, with two minor seconds, two major seconds, one augmented second, and two tritones contained in the chord.

== See also ==
- Z-relation
