= Diminished major seventh chord =

Chord

diminished major seventh
Component intervals from root
- major seventh
- diminished fifth (tritone)
- minor third
- root

Tuning
- 200:240:288:375

Forte no. / Complement
- 4-18 / 8-18

In music theory, a diminished major seventh chord is a seventh chord composed of a diminished triad and a major seventh. Thus, it is composed of a root note, together with a minor third, a diminished fifth, and a major seventh above the root: (1, ♭3, ♭5, 7). For example, the diminished major seventh chord built on C, commonly written as C^{oM7}, has pitches C–E♭–G♭–B:

Diminished major seventh chords are very dissonant, containing the dissonant intervals of the tritone and the major seventh. They are frequently encountered, especially in jazz, as a diminished seventh chord with an appoggiatura, especially when the melody has the leading note of the given chord: the ability to resolve this dissonance smoothly to a diatonic triad with the same root allows it to be used as a temporary tension before tonic resolution.

The chord can be represented by the integer notation {0, 3, 6, 11}.

== In other equal temperaments (edos) ==
edo	m3	d5	M7
17edo	4	8	16
19edo	5	10	17
22edo	5	10	21
26edo	7	14	23
27edo	6	12	26
29edo	7	14	27
31edo	8	16	28
41edo	10	20	38
53edo	13	26	49

== Diminished major seventh chord table ==
Chord	Root	Minor third	Diminished fifth	Major seventh
C^{o}^{M7}	C	E♭	G♭	B
C♯^{o}^{M7}	C♯	E	G	B♯ (C)
D♭^{o}^{M7}	D♭	F♭ (E)	A (G)	C
D^{o}^{M7}	D	F	A♭	C♯
D♯^{o}^{M7}	D♯	F♯	A	C (D)
E♭^{o}^{M7}	E♭	G♭	B (A)	D
E^{o}^{M7}	E	G	B♭	D♯
F^{o}^{M7}	F	A♭	C♭ (B)	E
F♯^{o}^{M7}	F♯	A	C	E♯ (F)
G♭^{o}^{M7}	G♭	B (A)	D (C)	F
G^{o}^{M7}	G	B♭	D♭	F♯
G♯^{o}^{M7}	G♯	B	D	F (G)
A♭^{o}^{M7}	A♭	C♭ (B)	E (D)	G
A^{o}^{M7}	A	C	E♭	G♯
A♯^{o}^{M7}	A♯	C♯	E	G (A)
B♭^{o}^{M7}	B♭	D♭	F♭ (E)	A
B^{o}^{M7}	B	D	F	A♯
