= Lydian chord =

Eleventh chord used in jazz music

In jazz music, the Lydian chord is the major 7♯11 chord, or ♯11 chord, the chord built on the first degree of the Lydian mode, the sharp eleventh being a compound augmented fourth. This chord, built on C, is shown below.

This is described as "beautiful" and "modern sounding." The notes that make up the Lydian chord represent five of the seven notes of the Lydian mode, and the ♯11 at the top of the chord is the ♯4 (one octave higher) that distinguishes the Lydian mode from the major scale.

Major 7♯11 may also refer to the Lydian augmented chord, an augmented seventh chord with augmented fourth appearing in the Lydian augmented scale.

In a chord chart, the notation "Lydian" indicates a major family chord with an added augmented eleventh, including maj7♯11, add9♯11, and 6♯11.

== Harmonic function ==
Lydian chords may function as subdominants or substitutes for the tonic in major keys. The compound interval of the augmented eleventh (enharmonically equivalent to ♯4, the characteristic interval of the Lydian mode) is used since the simple fourth usually only appears in suspended chords (which replace the third with a natural fourth, for example C^{sus4}). The fifth can be omitted to avoid creating dissonance with the ♯4; this is usually not specified in chord naming.

Cmaj^{7♯11} (C–E–(G)–B–F♯), with fifth omitted and included

The dominant 7♯11 or Lydian dominant (C^{7♯11}) comprises the notes:

r, 3, (5), ♭7, (9), ♯11, (13)

(Note that in jazz lead sheet notation, upper extensions (intervals beyond the 7th) aren't named unless they are altered; alternatively, when including the 9th and 13th this chord could be called a C^{13♯11}.)

Basing this chord on the pitch C results in the pitches:

C, E, (G), B♭, (D), F♯, (A)

A voicing of C^{7♯11} (C–E–(G)–B♭–D–F♯–A), with fifth omitted and the ♯4 doubled

The same chord may also be voiced:

C, E, B♭, F♯, A, D, F♯

This voicing omits the perfect fifth (G) and raises the major ninth (D) by an octave. The augmented eleventh (F♯) is also played twice in two different registers. This is known as "doubling".
