= Blue note =

Note sung or played at a slightly different pitch than standard

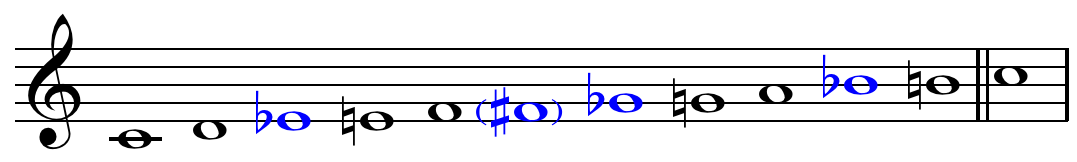
Blue notes (in blue): ♭3, (♯4)/♭5, ♭7

In jazz and blues, a blue note (or worried note) is a note that—for expressive purposes—is sung or played at a slightly different pitch from standard. Typically the alteration is between a quartertone and a semitone, but this varies depending on the musical context.

== Origins and meaning ==
Like the blues in general, the blue notes can mean many things. One quality that they all have in common, however, is that they are lower than one would expect, classically speaking. But this flatness may take several forms. On the one hand, it may be a microtonal affair of a quarter-tone or so. Here one may speak of neutral intervals, neither major nor minor. On the other hand, the lowering may be by a full semitone—as it must be, of course, on keyboard instruments. It may involve a glide, either upward or downward. Again, this may be a microtonal, almost imperceptible affair, or it may be a slur between notes a semitone apart, so that there is actually not one blue note but two. A blue note may even be marked by a microtonal shake of a kind common in Oriental music. The degrees of the mode treated in this way are, in order of frequency, the third, seventh, fifth, and sixth.

— Peter van der Merwe (1989), Origins of the Popular Style, p. 119

The blue notes are usually said to be the lowered third, lowered fifth, and lowered seventh scale degrees. The lowered fifth is also known as the raised fourth. Though the blues scale has "an inherent minor tonality, it is commonly 'forced' over major-key chord changes, resulting in a distinctively dissonant conflict of tonalities". A similar conflict occurs between the notes of the minor scale and the minor blues scale, as heard in songs such as "Why Don't You Do Right?", "Happy" and "Sweet About Me".

In the case of the lowered third over the root (or the lowered seventh over the dominant), the resulting chord is a neutral mixed third chord.

Blue notes are used in many blues songs, in jazz, and in conventional popular songs with a "blue" feeling, such as Harold Arlen's "Stormy Weather". Blue notes are also prevalent in English folk music. Bent or "blue notes", called in Ireland "long notes", play a vital part in Irish music.

== Theory and measurement ==
Music theorists have long speculated that blue notes are intervals of just intonation not derived from European 12-tone equal temperament tuning. Just intonation musical intervals derive directly from the harmonic series. Humans naturally learn the harmonic series as infants. This is essential for many auditory activities such as understanding speech (see formant) and perceiving tonal music. In the harmonic series, overtones of a fundamental tonic tone occur as integer multiples of the tonic frequency. It is therefore convenient to express musical intervals in this system as integer ratios (e.g. 2/1 = octave, 3/2 = perfect fifth, etc.). The relationship between just and equal temperament tuning is conveniently expressed using the 12-tone equal temperament cents system. Just intonation is common in music of other cultures such as the 17-tone Arabic scale and the 22-tone Indian classical music scale. In African cultures, just intonation scales are the norm rather than the exception. As the blues appears to have derived from a cappella field hollers of African slaves, it would be expected that its notes would be of just intonation origin closely related to the musical scales of western Africa.

The blue "lowered third" has been speculated to be from 7/6 (267 cents) to 350 cents above the tonic tone. It has recently been found empirically to center at 6/5 (316 cents, a minor third in just intonation, or a slightly sharp minor third in equal temperament) based on cluster analysis of a large number of blue notes from early blues recordings. This note is commonly slurred with a major third justly tuned at 5/4 (386 cents) in what Temperley et al. refer to as a "neutral third". This bending or glide between the two tones is an essential characteristic of the blues.

The blue "lowered fifth" has been found to be quite separate from the perfect fifth and clusters with the perfect fourth with which it is commonly slurred. This "raised fourth" is most commonly expressed at 7/5 (583 cents). The eleventh harmonic (i.e. 11/8 or 551 cents) as put forward by Kubik and Curry is also possible as it is in the middle of the slur between the perfect fourth at 4/3 and 7/5.

The blue "lowered seventh" appears to have two common locations at 7/4 (969 cents) and 9/5 (1018 cents). Kubik and Curry proposed 7/4 as it is commonly heard in the barbershop quartet harmonic seventh chord. The barbershop quartet idiom also appears to have arisen from African American origins. It was a surprising finding that 9/5 was a much more common tonal location although both were used in the blues, sometimes within the same song.

It should not be surprising that blue notes are not represented accurately in the 12-tone equal temperament system, which is made up of a cycle of very slightly flattened perfect fifths (i.e. 3/2). The just intonation blue note intervals identified above all involve prime numbers not equally divisible by 2 or 3. Prime-number harmonics greater than 3 are all perceptually different from 12-tone equal temperament notes.

The blues has likely evolved as a fusion of an African just intonation scale with European 12-tone musical instruments and harmony. The result has been a uniquely American music which is still widely practiced in its original form and is at the foundation of another genre, American jazz.

== See also ==
- Altered chord
- Harmonic seventh
- Major and minor
- Twelve-bar blues
