= Ninth chord =

Form of musical chord

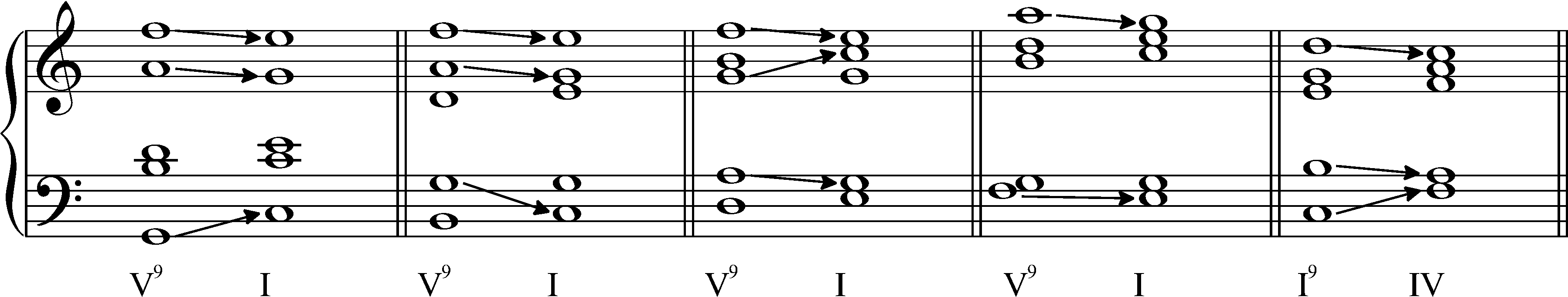
Resolutions given as examples by Arnold Schoenberg in his Theory of Harmony: V^{9} chords resolving to I chords

In music theory, a ninth chord is a chord that encompasses the interval of a ninth when arranged in close position with the root in the bass.

The ninth chord and its inversions exist today, or at least they can exist. The pupil will easily find examples in the literature [such as Schoenberg's Verklärte Nacht and Strauss's opera Salome]. It is not necessary to set up special laws for its treatment. If one wants to be careful, one will be able to use the laws that pertain to the seventh chords: that is, dissonances resolve by step downward, the root leaps a fourth upward.

— Arnold Schoenberg (1948)

Heinrich Schenker and also Nikolai Rimsky-Korsakov allowed the substitution of the dominant seventh, leading-tone, and leading tone half-diminished seventh chords, but rejected the concept of a ninth chord on the basis that only that on the fifth scale degree (V^{9}) was admitted and that inversion was not allowed of the ninth chord.

== Dominant ninth chord ==
Dominant ninth
Component intervals from root
- major ninth
- minor seventh
- perfect fifth
- major third
- root

Tuning
- 4:5:6:7:9

Forte no. / Complement
- 5-34 / 7-34

A dominant ninth chord is a dominant seventh chord plus a major ninth above the root. For instance, a C dominant ninth chord (C^{9}) consists of the notes C–E–G–B♭–D.

When the symbol "9" is not preceded by the word "major" or "maj" (e.g., C^{9}), the chord is a dominant ninth. The ninth is commonly chromatically altered by half-step either up or down to create more tension and dissonance. Fétis tuned the chord 4:5:6:7:9.

In the common practice period, "the root, 3rd, 7th, and 9th are the most common factors present in the V^{9} chord," with the 5th, "typically omitted". The ninth and seventh usually resolve downward to the fifth and third of I.

Example of tonic dominant ninth chords include Bobbie Gentry's "Ode to Billie Joe" and Wild Cherry's "Play That Funky Music". James Brown's "I Got You (I Feel Good)" features a striking dominant 9th arpeggio played staccato at the end of the opening 12-bar sequence. The opening phrase of Chopin's well-known "Minute Waltz" climaxes on a dominant 9th chord:

Chopin Waltz in D♭, Op. 64, No. 1

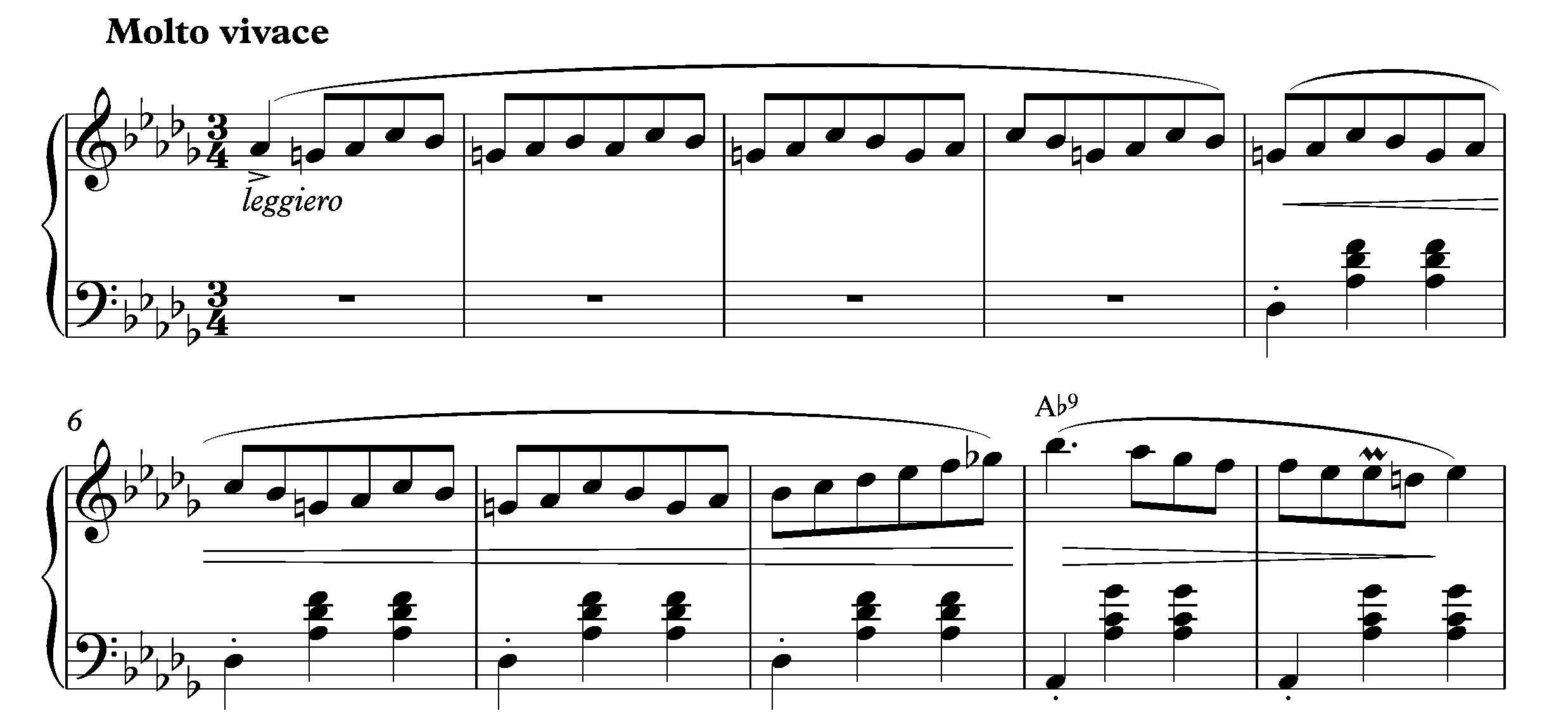
Chopin Waltz in D♭, Op. 64, No. 1

César Franck's Violin Sonata in A major opens with a dominant ninth chord (E^{9}) in the piano part. When the violin enters in the fifth bar, its melody articulates an arpeggio of this chord.

Cesar Franck Violin Sonata in A major, opening bars

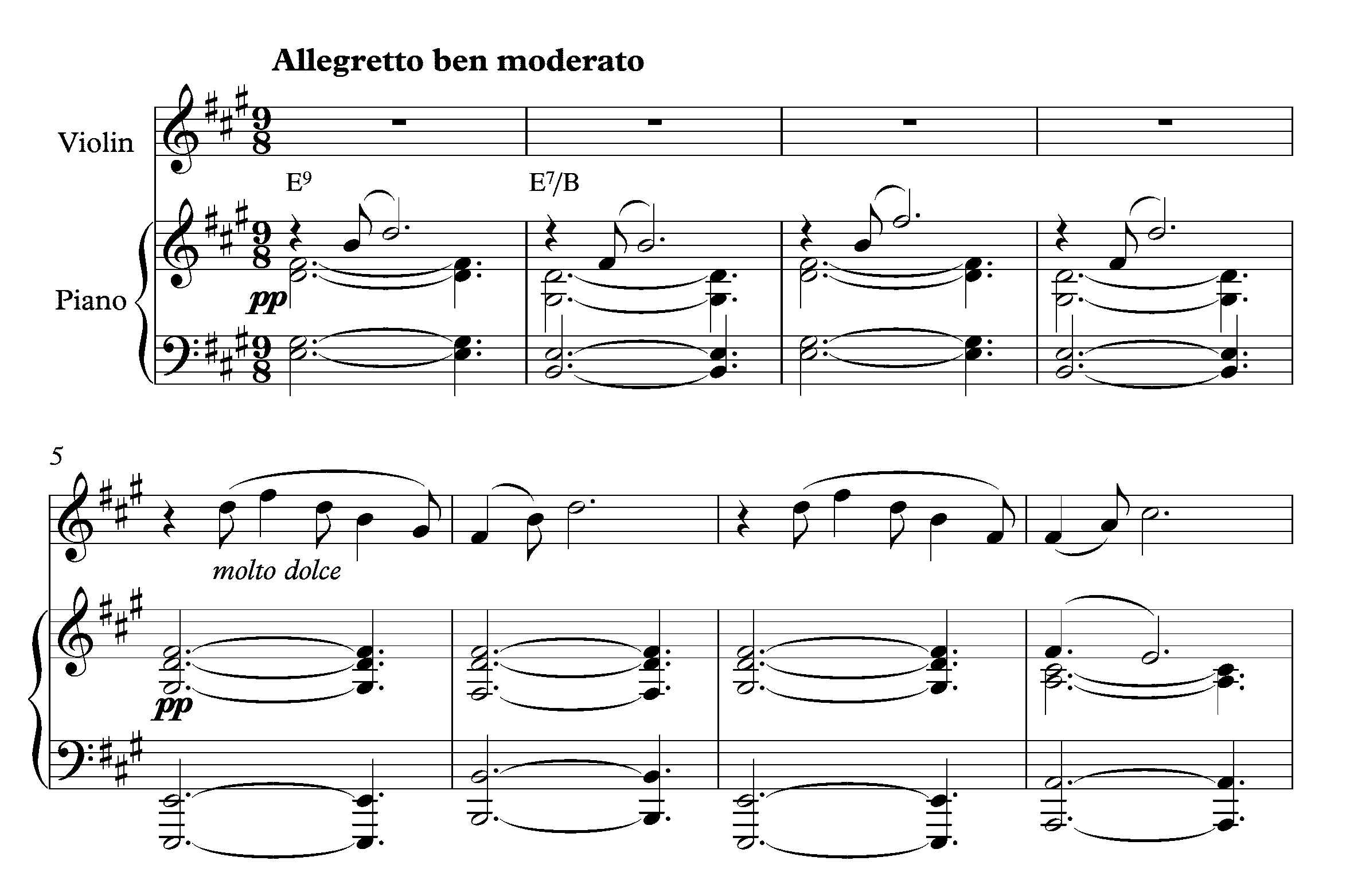
Cesar Franck, Violin Sonata in A major, opening bars

Debussy's "Hommage a Rameau", the second of his first Book of Images for piano solo climaxes powerfully on a dominant ninth, expressed both as a chord and as a wide-ranging arpeggio:

Debussy, from Hommage a Rameau

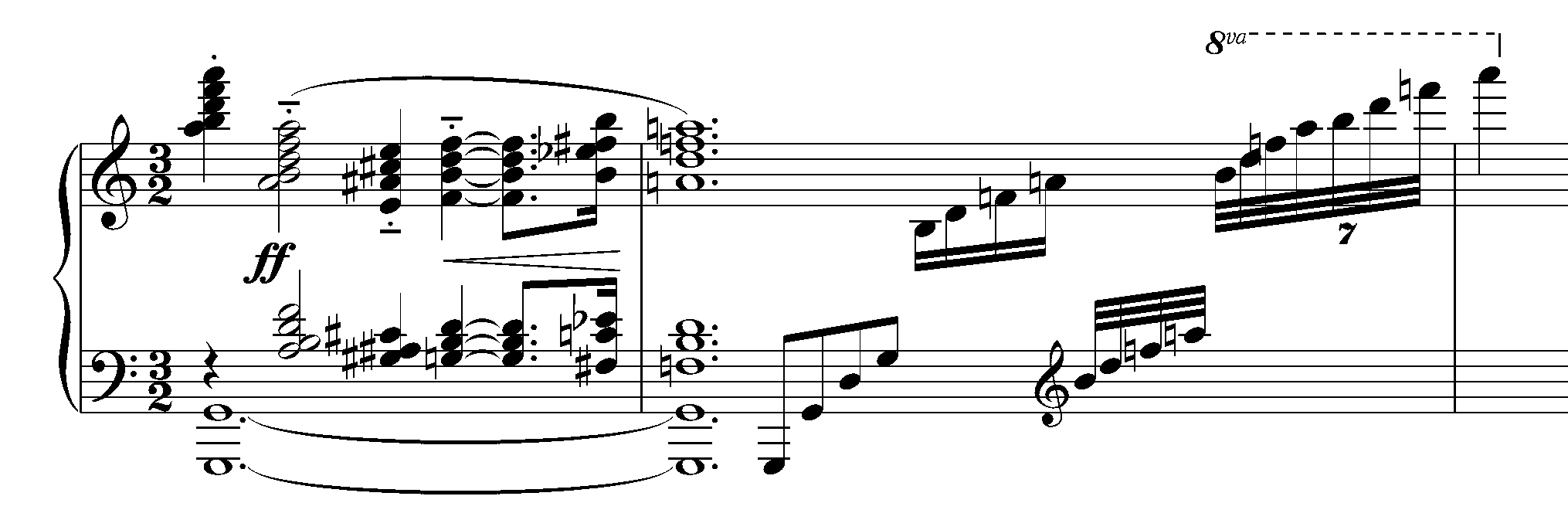
Debussy, from Hommage a Rameau

The starting point of Karlheinz Stockhausen's piece for vocal sextet, Stimmung (1968) is a chord consisting of the notes B♭, F, B♭, D, A♭ and C. According to Nicholas Cook, Stimmung could, in terms of conventional tonal harmony, be viewed as "simply a dominant ninth chord that is subject to timbral variation. The notes the performers sing are harmonics 2, 3, 4, 5, 7, and 9 of the implied but absent fundamental—the B flat below the bass clef."

== Dominant minor ninth chord ==
Dominant minor ninth
Component intervals from root
- minor ninth
- minor seventh
- perfect fifth
- major third
- root

Tuning
- 8:10:12:14:17

Forte no. / Complement
- 5-31 / 7-31

A dominant minor ninth chord consists of a dominant seventh chord and a minor ninth above the root. For instance, a C dominant minor ninth chord (C^{7♭9}) consists of the notes C–E–G–B♭–D♭.

In notation for jazz and popular music, this chord is often denoted, e.g., C^{7♭9}.

Fétis tuned the chord 8:10:12:14:17.

In Schubert's Erlkönig, a terrified child calls out to his father when he sees an apparition of the sinister Elf King. The dissonant voicing of the dominant minor ninth chord used here (C^{7♭9}) is particularly effective in heightening the drama and sense of threat.

The chord of the ninth ... is merely an additional note added to the chord of the flat seventh, which in the ... minor mode a semitone above the eighth. In the latter case it is called the flat ninth, and is used in the minor keys almost as frequently as the flat seventh is in the major keys; but as its effect on the ear, when the fundamental tone or root is used, is rather harsh, its inversions alone are generally used. This latter chord, when occasionally changed enharmonically for the purpose of making sudden transitions or modulations into distant keys, gratifies the ear more than any other chord.

— John Smith (1853)

(Excerpt from Schubert's Erlkönig – Link to passage)

Writing about this passage, Taruskin (2010, p. 149) remarks on the

unprecedented ... level of dissonance at the boy's outcries ... The voice has the ninth, pitched above, and the left hand has the seventh, pitched below. The result is a virtual 'tone cluster' ... the harmonic logic of these progressions, within the rules of composition Schubert was taught, can certainly be demonstrated. That logic, however, is not what appeals so strongly to the listener's imagination; rather it is the calculated impression (or illusion) of wild abandon.

== Minor ninth chord ==
Minor ninth
Component intervals from root
- major ninth
- minor seventh
- perfect fifth
- minor third
- root

Tuning
- 20:24:30:36:45

Forte no. / Complement
- 5-27 / 7-27

The minor ninth chord consists of a minor seventh chord and a major ninth above the root. For instance, a C minor ninth chord (Cm^{9}) consists of the notes C–E♭–G–B♭–D.

The formula is 1, ♭3, 5, ♭7, 9. This chord has a more "bluesy" sound and fits very well with the dominant ninth.

== Major ninth chord ==
Major ninth
Component intervals from root
- major ninth
- major seventh
- perfect fifth
- major third
- root

Tuning
- 8:10:12:15:18

Forte no. / Complement
- 5-27 / 7-27

Parallel root-position bop voicings that open the choruses of Thelonious Monk's 1959 "Monk's Mood" feature a (C) major ninth chord.

A major ninth chord (e.g., Cmaj^{9}), as an extended chord, adds the major seventh along with the ninth to the major triad. For instance, a C major ninth chord (Cmaj^{9}) consists of the notes C–E–G–B–D.

Examples include Edvard Grieg's "Wedding Day at Troldhaugen" and Ennio Morricone's "In una stanza con poca luce" from Once Upon a Time in the West.

== Dominant seventh sharp ninth chord ==
Dominant seventh sharp ninth chord
Component intervals from root
- augmented ninth
- minor seventh
- perfect fifth
- major third
- root

Tuning
- 160:200:240:288:375

Forte no. / Complement
- 5-32 / 7-32

A dominant seventh sharp ninth chord is a dominant seventh chord plus an augmented ninth above the root. For instance, a C dominant seventh sharp ninth chord (C^{7♯9}) consists of the notes C–E–G–B♭–D♯.

== Relation to other chords with the ninth ==
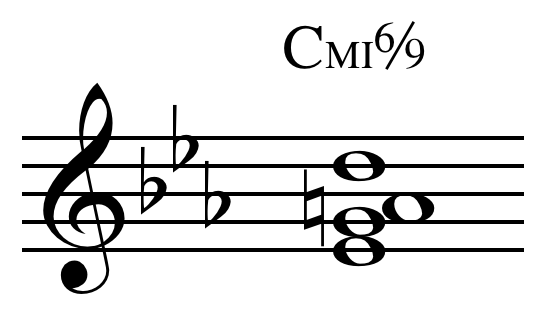
Minor 6/9 C chord, featuring the major sixth degree of the jazz minor scale.

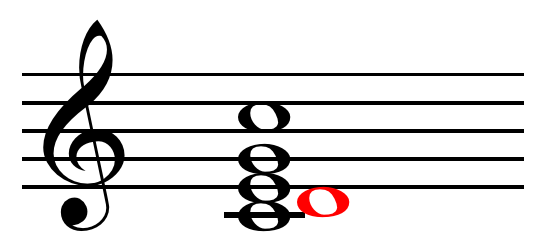
Second factor (D), in red, of a C added second chord, C^{add2}.

The 6/9 chord is a pentad with a major triad joined by a sixth and ninth above the root, but no seventh. For example, C^{6/9} is C–E–G–A–D. It is not a tense chord requiring resolution, and is considered a substitute for the tonic in jazz. The minor 6/9 chord is a minor triad with an added 6th and 9th, evoking the Dorian mode, and is also suitable as a minor tonic in jazz.

The second degree is octave equivalent to the ninth. The ninth chord could be alternatively notated as seventh added second chord (C^{7add2}), from where omitting the 3rd produces the seventh suspended second chord (C^{7sus2}).

An add9 chord, or added ninth chord, is any chord with an added ninth – C^{add9} consists of C, E, G and D, Cm^{add9} consists of C, E flat, G, and D, Cdim^{add9} consists of C, E flat, G flat, and D, etc. Added ninth chords differ from other ninth chords because the seventh is not necessarily included. An add9 can also be added to an interval, like a C5, resulting in a C5^{add9} chord which consists of C and G (C5) with D as an added 9 (C, G, D). Note that if the note is within an octave from the root, it is a second, not a ninth. In the case of C, D, G, within a fifth rather than spanning a ninth, this is a C^{sus2} chord, where the second, D, replaces the third, E (C, D, G instead of C, E, G).

== See also ==
- Jazz chord
- Dominant seventh sharp ninth chord
