= Farben chord =

Chord

Component intervals from root
- perfect fourth
- perfect fourth
- minor third
- augmented fifth
- root

Forte no.
- 5-z17

The Farben chord is the basis of the third movement of Arnold Schoenberg's 1909 suite Five Pieces for Orchestra, Op.16. The third movement of the suite is titled "Farben" (colors). The chord includes the notes C–G♯–B–E–A.

Its unordered pitch-class content in normal form is 01348 (e.g., C–C♯–E♭–E–G♯), its Forte number is 5-z17, in the taxonomy of Allen Forte.

Schoenberg developed the pentad canonically in "Farben". The orchestral voices are set in a canon on a 3-note motif: an upward semitone, and a downward whole tone. Beginning in the third measure, Schoenberg has each voice of the chord play the motif in canon until the entire sonority has been shifted down a half step in the ninth measure.

The chord is also part of the basis for Act I scene 2 of Alban Berg's Wozzeck. The pentad is "almost octatonic" and has been called "a 'classic' atonal set type". The chord relates the movement to the other movements of the piece, with it appearing as the first chord of movement No.2 and in movement No.4, "The figure in the first bar [of op.16/IV] is actually a horizontal version of the chord from the preceding movement."
