= All-interval tetrachord =

An all-interval tetrachord is a tetrachord, a collection of four pitch classes, containing all six interval classes. There are only two possible all-interval tetrachords (to within inversion), when expressed in prime form. In set theory notation, these are [0,1,4,6] (4-Z15) and [0,1,3,7] (4-Z29). The following are examples of each all-interval tetrachord.

Their inversions are [0,2,5,6] (4-Z15b) and [0,4,6,7] (4-Z29b), respectively. The interval vector for both all-interval tetrachords is <1,1,1,1,1,1>.

== Table of interval classes as relating to all-interval tetrachords ==
In the examples below, the tetrachords [0,1,4,6] and [0,1,3,7] are built on E.

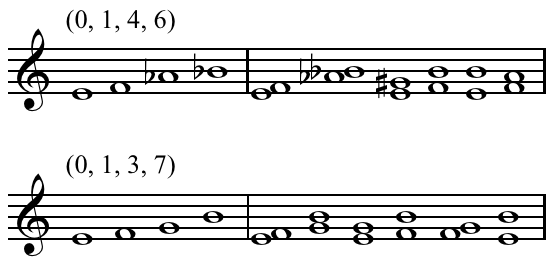
All-interval tetrachord dyads.

Interval class table for [0,1,4,6]
ic	notes of [0,1,4,6] built on E	diatonic counterparts
1	E to F	minor 2nd and major 7th
2	A♭ to B♭	major 2nd and minor 7th
3	F to A♭	minor 3rd and major 6th
4	E to G♯	major 3rd and minor 6th
5	F to B♭	perfect 4th and perfect 5th
6	E to B♭	augmented 4th and diminished 5th

Interval class table for [0,1,3,7]
ic	notes of [0,1,3,7] built on E	diatonic counterparts
1	E to F	minor 2nd and major 7th
2	F to G	major 2nd and minor 7th
3	E to G	minor 3rd and major 6th
4	G to B	major 3rd and minor 6th
5	E to B	perfect 4th and perfect 5th
6	F to B	augmented 4th and diminished 5th

== Use in modern music ==
The unique qualities of the all-interval tetrachord have made it very popular in 20th-century music. Composers including Frank Bridge, Elliott Carter (First String Quartet) and George Perle used it extensively.

== See also ==
- All-interval twelve-tone row
- All-trichord hexachord
- Perfect ruler
- Serialism
- Trichord
