= Peter van der Merwe (musicologist) =

South African musicologist

Peter van der Merwe is a self-taught musicologist, author, and librarian. He was born in Cape Town, South Africa, and has written several books on the history of modern popular and classical music. He studied at the College of Music at the University of Cape Town. He also works as a cataloguer at the municipal library in Pietermaritzburg.

== Bibliography ==
- (1989). Origins of the Popular Style: The Antecedents of Twentieth-Century Popular Music. Oxford: Clarendon Press. ISBN 0-19-316121-4.
- (2005) Roots of the Classical: the Popular Origins of Western Music. ISBN 0-19-816647-8
