= Eleventh chord =

Concept in music theory

In music theory, an eleventh chord is a chord that contains the tertian extension of the eleventh. Typically found in jazz, an eleventh chord also usually includes the seventh and ninth, and elements of the basic triad structure. Variants include:

C^{11}, Cm^{11}, and Cmaj^{11} chords
- the dominant eleventh chord (e.g., C^{11}, C–E–G–B♭–D–F)
- the minor eleventh chord (e.g., Cm^{11}, C–E♭–G–B♭–D–F)
- the major eleventh chord (e.g., Cmaj^{11}, C–E–G–B–D–F).

Using an augmented eleventh produces

C^{9♯11} and Cmaj^{9♯11} chords
- the dominant sharp eleventh chord (e.g., C^{9♯11}, C–E–G–B♭–D–F♯)
- the major ninth sharp chord (e.g., Cmaj^{9♯11}, C–E–G–B–D–F♯)

A perfect eleventh creates a highly dissonant minor ninth interval with the major third of major and dominant chords. To reduce this dissonance the third is often omitted (such as for example in the dominant eleventh chord that can be heard 52 seconds into the song "Sun King" on The Beatles' Abbey Road album), turning the chord into a suspended ninth chord (e.g. C^{9sus4}, C–G–B♭–D–F), which can be also notated as Gm^{7}/C.

Another solution to this dissonance is altering the third or eleventh factor of the chord to turn the problematic minor ninth interval within the chord into a major ninth. A dominant eleventh chord can be altered by lowering the third by a semitone for a minor eleventh chord, or by raising the eleventh by a semitone for a dominant sharp eleventh chord, implying the lydian dominant mode.

As its upper extensions (7th, 9th, 11th) constitute a triad, a dominant eleventh chord with the third and fifth omitted can be notated as a compound chord with a bass note. So C–B♭–D–F is written as B♭/C, emphasizing the ambiguous dominant/subdominant character of this voicing.

In the common practice period, the root, 7th, 9th, and 11th are the most common factors present in the V^{11} chord, with the 3rd and 5th typically omitted. The eleventh is usually retained as a common tone when the chord resolves to I or i.

== Relation to suspended fourth chord ==
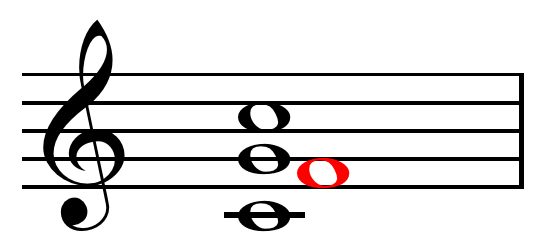
Fourth factor (F), in red, of a C suspended fourth chord, C^{sus4}.

The fourth degree is octave equivalent to the eleventh. The dominant eleventh chord could be alternatively notated as the very unorthodox ninth added fourth chord (C^{9add4}), from where omitting the 3rd produces the more common ninth suspended fourth chord (C^{9sus4}, also known as the jazz sus chord).

== See also ==
- Elektra chord
- Jazz chord
- Bridge chord
