= Interval vector =

Interval content of a given set in musical set theory

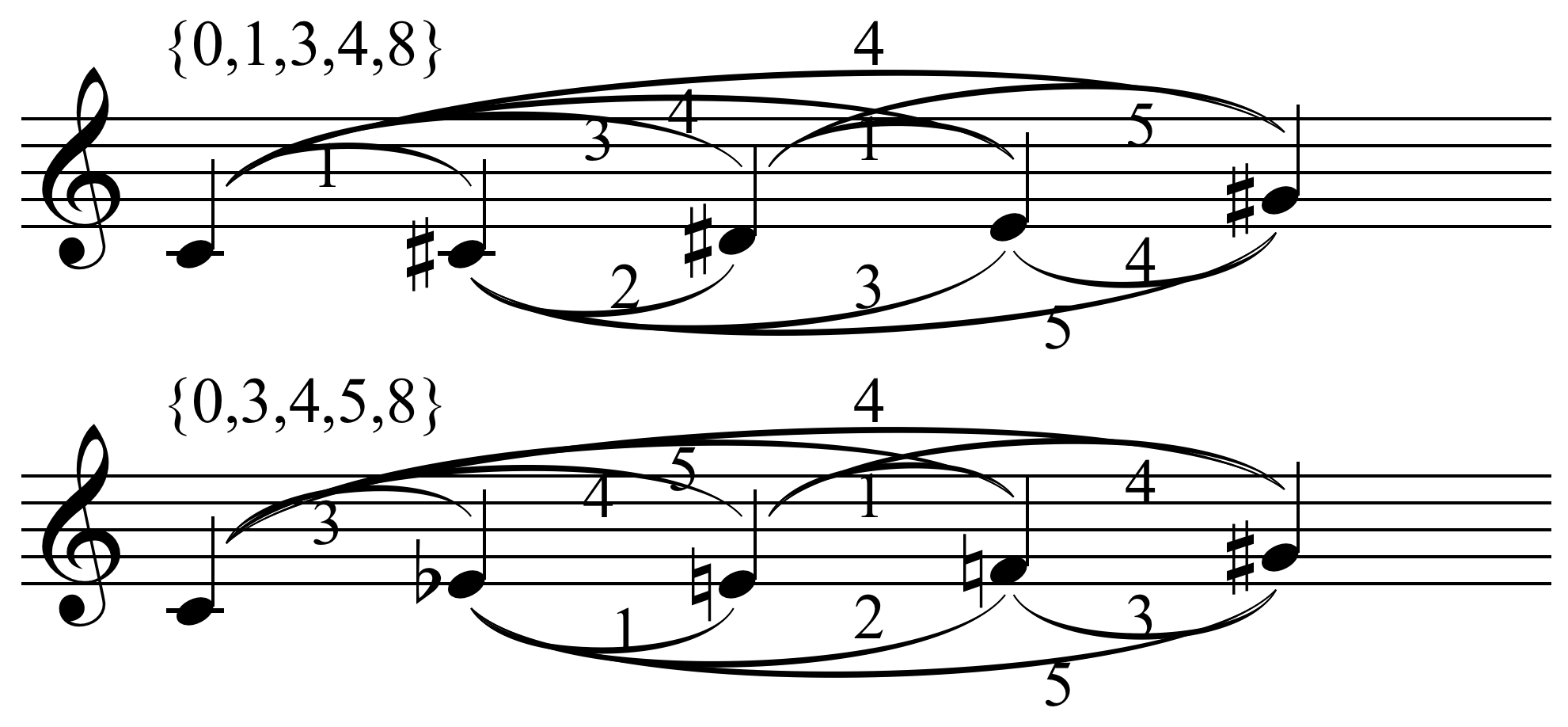
Example of Z-relation on two pitch sets analyzable as or derivable from set 5-Z17, with intervals between pitch classes labeled for ease of comparison between the two sets and their common interval vector, 212320.

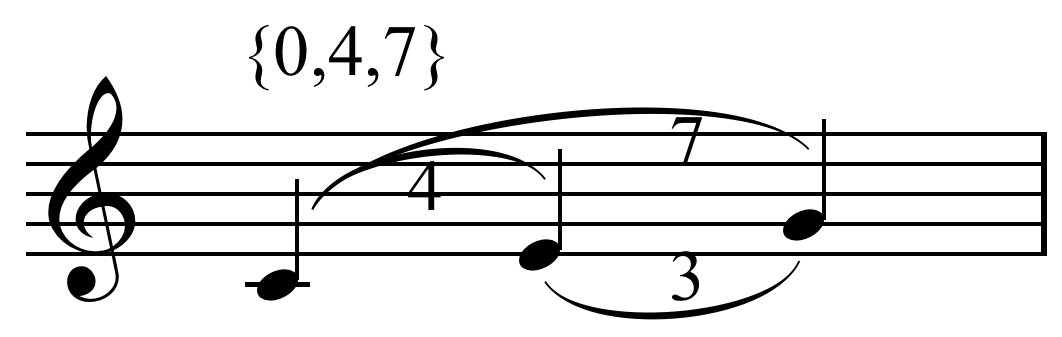
Interval vector: C major chord, set 3-11B, {0,4,7}: 001110.

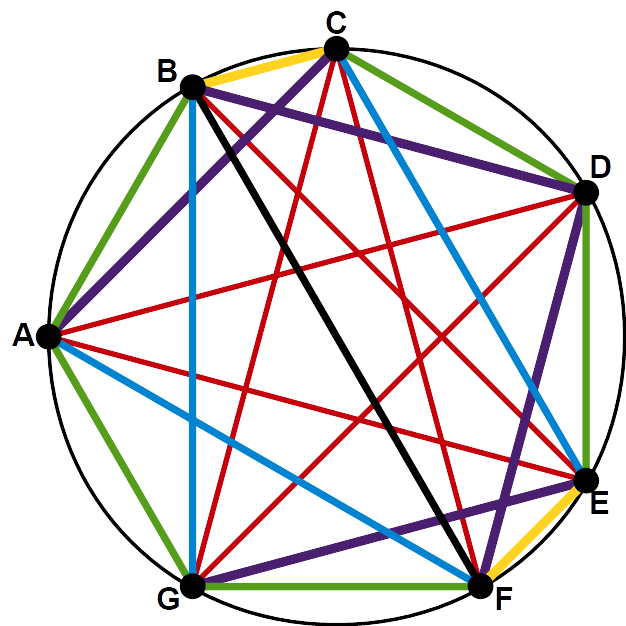
Diatonic scale in the chromatic circle with each interval class a different color, each occurs a unique number of times

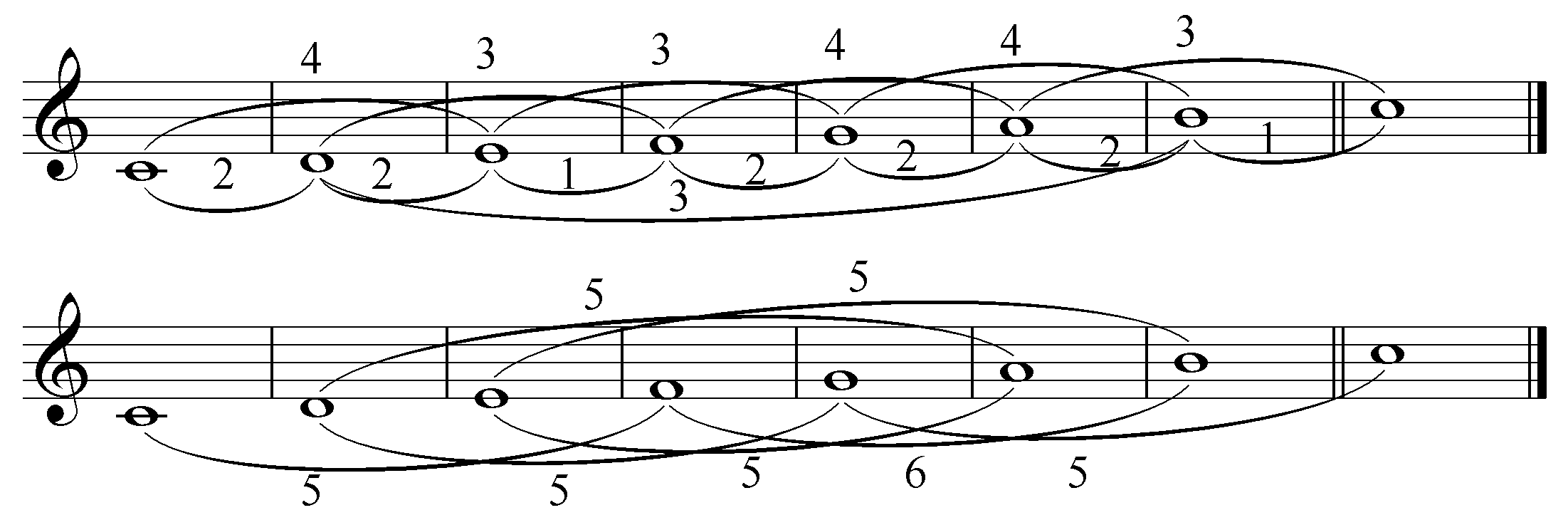
C major scale with interval classes labelled; vector: 254361

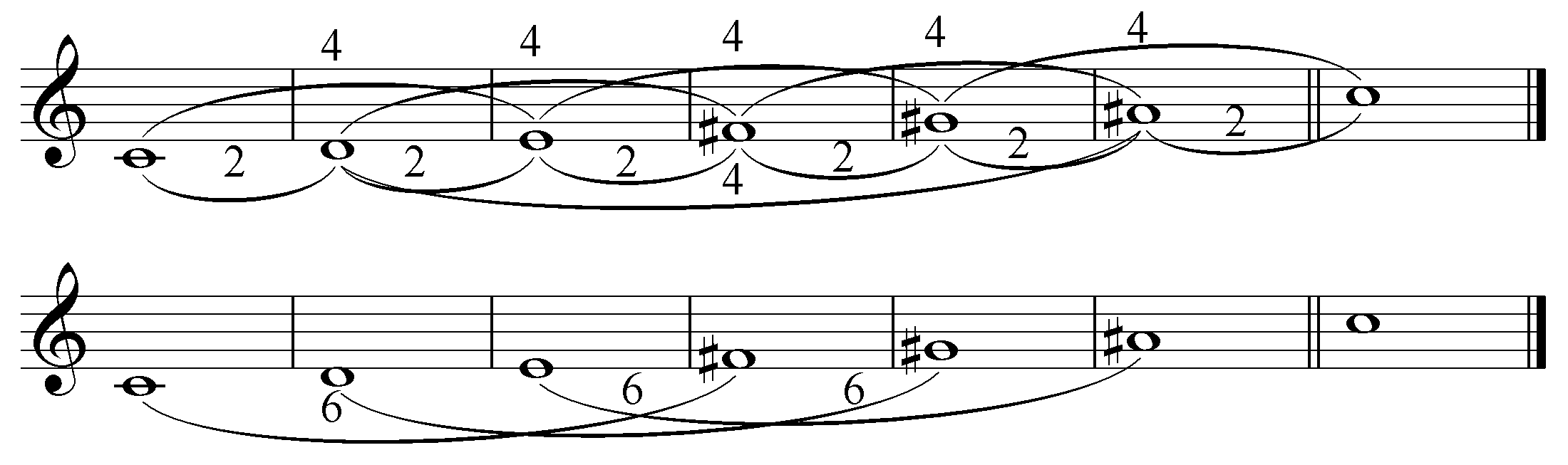
Whole tone scale on C with interval classes labelled; vector: 060603

In musical set theory, an interval vector is an array of natural numbers which summarize the intervals present in a set of pitch classes. (That is, a set of pitches where octaves are disregarded.) Other names include: ic vector (or interval-class vector), PIC vector (or pitch-class interval vector) and APIC vector (or absolute pitch-class interval vector, which Michiel Schuijer states is more proper.)

While primarily an analytic tool, interval vectors can also be useful for composers, as they quickly show the sound qualities that are created by different collections of pitch class. That is, sets with high concentrations of conventionally dissonant intervals (i.e., seconds and sevenths) sound more dissonant, while sets with higher numbers of conventionally consonant intervals (i.e., thirds and sixths) sound more consonant. While the actual perception of consonance and dissonance involves many contextual factors, such as register, an interval vector can nevertheless be a helpful tool.

== Definition ==
In twelve-tone equal temperament, an interval vector has six digits, with each digit representing the number of times an interval class appears in the set. Because interval classes are used, the interval vector for a given set remains the same, regardless of the set's permutation or vertical arrangement. The interval classes designated by each digit ascend from left to right. That is:

1. minor seconds/major sevenths (1 or 11 semitones)
2. major seconds/minor sevenths (2 or 10 semitones)
3. minor thirds/major sixths (3 or 9 semitones)
4. major thirds/minor sixths (4 or 8 semitones)
5. perfect fourths/perfect fifths (5 or 7 semitones)
6. tritones (6 semitones) (The tritone is inversionally equivalent to itself.)

Interval class 0, representing unisons and octaves, is omitted.

In his 1960 book, The Harmonic Materials of Modern Music, Howard Hanson introduced a monomial method of notation for this concept, which he termed intervallic content: p^{e}m^{d}n^{c}.s^{b}d^{a}t^{f} for what would now be written ⟨abcdef⟩. (Note: To quantify the consonant-dissonant content of a set, Hanson ordered the intervals according to their dissonance degree, with p=perfect fifth, m=major third, n=minor third, s=major second, d=(more dissonant) minor second, t=tritone.) The modern notation, introduced by Donald Martino in 1961, has considerable advantages and is extendable to any equal division of the octave. Allen Forte in his 1973 work The Structure of Atonal Music notated the interval vector using square brackets, citing Martino; subsequent authors, e.g. John Rahn, use angled brackets.

A scale whose interval vector has six unique digits is said to have the deep scale property. The major scale and its modes have this property.

For a practical example, the interval vector for a C major triad (3-11B) in the root position, {C E G}, is ⟨001110⟩. This means that the set has one major third or minor sixth (i.e. from C to E, or E to C), one minor third or major sixth (i.e. from E to G, or G to E), and one perfect fifth or perfect fourth (i.e. from C to G, or G to C). As the interval vector does not change with transposition or inversion, it belongs to the entire set class, meaning that ⟨001110⟩ is the vector of all major (and minor) triads. Some interval vectors correspond to more than one sets that cannot be transposed or inverted to produce the other. (These are called Z-related sets, explained below).

For a set of n pitch classes, the sum of all the numbers in the set's interval vector equals the binomial coefficient $\tbinom{n}{2} = \tfrac{n (n-1)}{2}$, since the interval vector elements are computed comparing each pair of pitch classes from the set consisting of n elements. This corresponds also to the triangular number $T_{n-1}$.

An expanded form of the interval vector is also used in transformation theory, as set out in David Lewin's Generalized Musical Intervals and Transformations.

== Z-relation ==
Successive Z-related hexachords from act 3 of Wozzeck

In musical set theory, a Z-relation, also called isomeric relation, is a relation between two pitch class sets in which the two sets have the same intervallic content (and thus the same interval vector) but they are not transpositionally related (are of different T_{n}-type ) or inversionally related (are of different T_{n}/T_{n}I-type). For example, the two sets 4-z15A {0,1,4,6} and 4-z29A {0,1,3,7} have the same interval vector ⟨111111⟩ but one can not transpose and/or invert the one set onto the other.

In the case of hexachords each may be referred to as a Z-hexachord. Any hexachord not of the "Z" type is its own complement while the complement of a Z-hexachord is its Z-correspondent, for example 6-Z3 and 6-Z36. See: 6-Z44, 6-Z17, 6-Z11, and Forte number.

The symbol "Z", standing for "zygotic" (from the Greek, meaning paired or yoked, such as the fusion of two reproductive cells), originated with Allen Forte in 1964, but the notion seems to have first been considered by Howard Hanson. Hanson called this the isomeric relationship, and defined two such sets as isomeric. See: isomer.

According to Michiel Schuijer (2008), the hexachord theorem, that any two pitch-class complementary hexachords have the same interval vector, even if they are not equivalent under transposition and inversion, was first proposed by Milton Babbitt, and, "the discovery of the relation," was, "reported," by David Lewin in 1960 as an example of the complement theorem: that the difference between pitch-class intervals in two complementary pitch-class sets is equal to the difference between the cardinal number of the sets (given two hexachords, this difference is 0). Mathematical proofs of the hexachord theorem were published by Kassler (1961), Regener (1974), and Wilcox (1983).

Though it is commonly observed that Z-related sets always occur in pairs, David Lewin noted that this is a result of twelve-tone equal temperament (12-ET). In 16-ET, Z-related sets are found as triplets. Lewin's student Jonathan Wild continued this work for other tuning systems, finding Z-related tuplets with up to 16 members in higher ET systems.

The equivalence relationship of `having the same interval content', allowing the trivial isometric case, was initially studied in crystallography and is known as Homometry. For instance the complement theorem is known to physicists as Babinet's principle. For a recent survey see.

Straus argues, "[sets] in the Z-relation will sound similar because they have the same interval content," which has led certain composers to exploit the Z-relation in their work. For instance, the play between {0,1,4,6} and {0,1,3,7} is clear in Elliott Carter's Second String Quartet.

=== Multiplication ===
Some Z-related chords are connected by M or IM (multiplication by 5 or multiplication by 7), due to identical entries for 1 and 5 on the interval vector.

== See also ==
- Interval cycle
- Pitch interval
