= Northern lights chord =

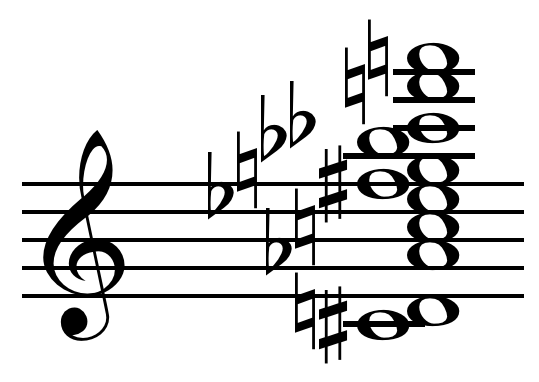
Northern Lights chord.

In music, the Northern Lights chord is an eleven-note chord from Ernst Krenek's Cantata for Wartime (1943), that represents the Northern Lights. Krenek's student Robert Erickson cited the chord as an example of a texture arranged so as to "closely approach the single-object status of fused-ensemble timbres, for example, the beautiful 'northern lights' ... chord, in a very interesting distribution of pitches, produces a fused sound supported by a suspended cymbal roll." "The 'northern lights' sounds, so icy and impersonal and menacing, are a brilliant orchestral invention."

At eleven notes, the chord is one pitch shy of the total chromatic. Every note except E is sounded.
