= Dominant seventh sharp ninth chord =

Musical chord

Dominant 7♯9 chord
Component intervals from root
- sharp ninth
- flat seventh
- perfect fifth
- major third
- root

Forte no. / Complement
- 5–32 / 7–32

In music, the dominant 7♯9 chord ("dominant seven sharp nine" or "dominant seven sharp ninth") is a chord built by combining a dominant seventh, which includes a major third above the root, with an augmented second, which is the same pitch as the minor third degree above the root, with a different name. For example, a G dominant dominant 7♯9 chord (G^{7♯9}) consists of the notes G–B–D–F–A♯.

This chord is used in many forms of contemporary popular music, including jazz, funk, R&B, rock and pop. As a dominant chord in diatonic harmony, it most commonly functions as a turnaround chord, returning to the tonic.

The chord is also sometimes colloquially known, among pop and rock guitarists, as the "Hendrix chord" or "Purple Haze chord", nicknamed for guitarist Jimi Hendrix, who showed a preference for the chord and did a great deal to popularize its use in mainstream rock music. When used by the Beatles it has been called the "Gretty chord" although this can refer to a distinct six-string version.

== Spelling and notation ==
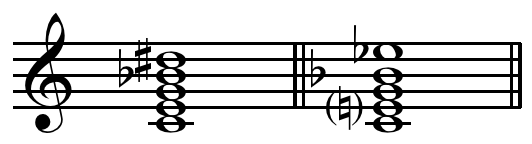
Dominant seventh raised ninth vs. dominant seventh split third chord

There are two main ways to spell the chord, depending on the musical style, kind of musical notation (score or chord symbols), and personal taste. One consists of a dominant seventh chord with an added minor third placed one or more octaves over the major third (a minor tenth); the other, more common, consists of a dominant seventh chord with an added augmented ninth. The former can be written in popular chord symbol notation systems as 7♭10 and the latter as 7♯9. Writing it as 7♭10 is unorthodox but is done in some contexts.

Sometimes, in a publication that includes both traditionally notated music and chord symbols, the music is notated with both a natural and a flattened third, while the chord symbol has the sharpened ninth. Other more uncommon notations and names include major/minor or 7 (add min 3). Kenn Stephenson says that in rock music the sharp ninth spelling is much more prevalent than the split third version.

== Nature of the chord ==
The 7♯9 is an altered chord, and it is one option when seeing the chord symbol 7alt. It is functionally a dominant chord and thus "wants" to resolve to the tonic in diatonic harmony. Stuart Isacoff has called the chord "funky" or "bluesy" because of the tension "generated between the major third and the augmented ninth"; while Doug Munro deems it "jazzy" rather than bluesy. Eric Starr says, "the sharp nine tends to be edgier, bluesier, and meaner sounding [than the flat nine]." In jazz, 7♯9 chords, along with 7♭9 chords, are often employed as the dominant chord in a minor ii–V–I turnaround. For example, a ii–V–I in C minor could be played as: Dm^{7♭5} – G^{^{7♯9}} – Cm^{7}.

The 7♯9 represents a major divergence from the world of tertian chord theory, where chords are stacks of major and minor thirds. The 7♯9 does not satisfy that definition, as the interval between the minor seventh and augmented ninth is an augmented third. The same also pertains to the rarer M7♭9, where the interval between the major seventh and minor ninth is a diminished third. Rather than fully allow the inclusion of diminished and augmented thirds into the theory, a typical solution in jazz is to define chords as stacks of chordal degrees, where each degree has some range of selection from which to take its note or notes. Thus, for example, the ninth is available in flat, natural, sharp, and flat-and-sharp "alt" styles.

== History ==
=== Classical ===
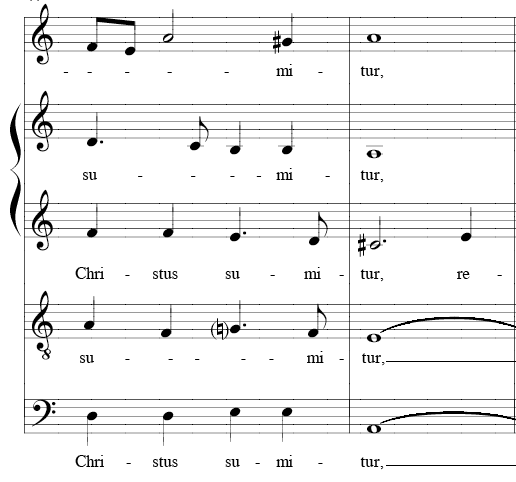
Excerpt from O sacrum convivium by Thomas Tallis. (Incidentally, the editor has helpfully put a courtesy accidental on the tenor's G natural. See also musica ficta.)

The English cadence is a distinctive contrapuntal pattern particular to the authentic or perfect cadence described as archaic or old-fashioned. This pattern was primarily used by English composers of the High Renaissance and Restoration periods. The hallmark of this device is the dissonant augmented octave (compound augmented unison) produced by a false relation between the split seventh scale degree.

The English cadence is a type of full close featuring the blue seventh against the dominant chord which in C would be B♭ and G-B♮-D.

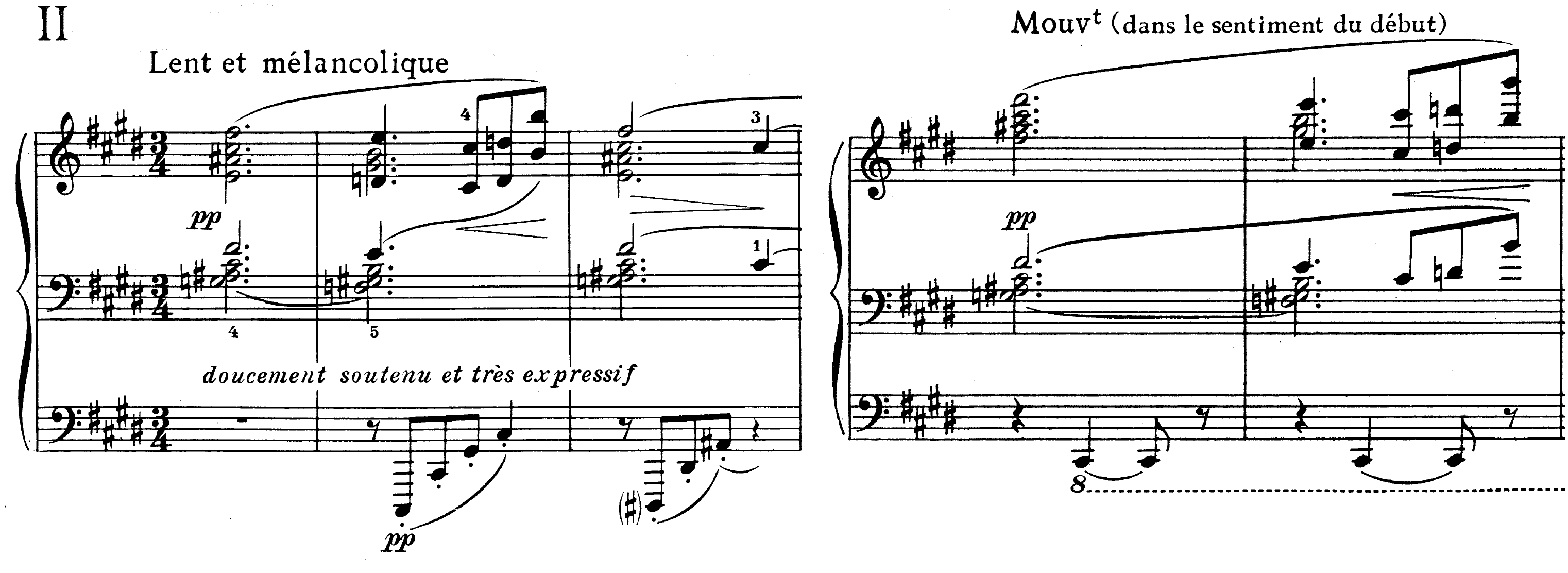
Measures 1–3 and 41–42 of Debussy's Feuilles Mortes, from his second book of Préludes (1913).

The dominant 7♯9 chord appears in impressionist classical music. Examples can be heard in Claude Debussy's Feuilles Mortes, from his second book of Préludes (1913). There, the unresolved, dissonant ninth chords (at least a "C♯7" with a "split third" and "added minor ninth") help create, according to Richard Bass, the piece's "utterly sad, desolate character". More examples of the 7♯9 chord are in bars 15 and 16 of Feuilles Mortes, with voicings typical of the Hendrix chord, where the augmented ninth is the chord's highest note.

This chord is also found in serial music. For example, Karlheinz Stockhausen's Elektronische Musik vom Freitag aus Licht (1991–94), from an opera composed using formula technique, concludes on this chord.

=== Jazz and blues ===
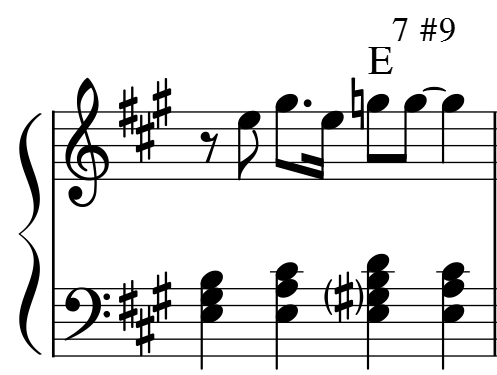
♯9 dominant seventh chord (on E: m3=G♮=F=A9).

The dominant 7♯9 chord is usually found in blues contexts because in a blues scale a minor third (blue note) in the melody is usually played against a dominant seventh chord. The third of the dominant chord is the seventh degree of the scale. The chord was used in popular music as far back as the bebop era of the 1940s, and it appears with some regularity in blues and rhythm-and-blues of the 1950s and 1960s.

=== Pop and rock ===
==== Hendrix chord ====
E^{7♯9}, in guitar chord chart format.

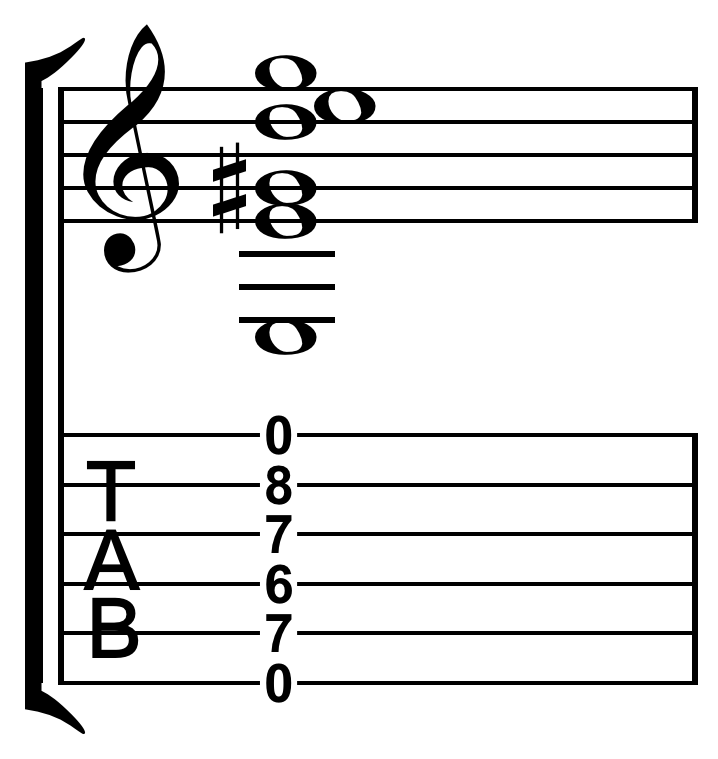
Hendrix chord E^{7♯9}, as it may be played on a guitar in an open position.

While this sonority has been previously used in jazz and related styles, one particular voicing of this chord is commonly called the "Hendrix Chord" by rock guitarists. This is because it was a favorite of Jimi Hendrix, who did a great deal to popularize its use in mainstream rock music.

The most notable Hendrix song that features the 7♯9 chord is "Purple Haze", while it is also implied in "Foxy Lady", both on his 1967 album Are You Experienced?. When performing "Voodoo Child (Slight Return)" live, Hendrix later used not only E^{7♯9}, the sharpened ninth chord on the tonic, but also D^{7♯9} and C^{7♯9} chords, the subtonic and submediant.

This harmonic device is one of many factors that, according to Gleebeek and Spairo, contribute to "the dirty, raw, metallic, angular sounds of [...] Hendrix songs". It is an example of how he embellished chords "to add new colours to the music, often derived from his own roots in black music". "In essence," John Perry writes, the Hendrix chord is "the whole of the blues scale condensed into a single chord."

==== Other musicians ====
The chord is heard quietly at the end of the bridge in Santo and Johnny's 1959 instrumental hit "Sleep Walk". It was also used more prominently by the Beatles in songs such as "The Word" and "Taxman". Paul McCartney called this a "great ham-fisted jazz chord" that was taught to them by Jim Gretty, who worked at Hessey's music shop in Whitechapel, central Liverpool. George Harrison uses it as the penultimate chord of his solo on "Till There Was You".

The chord (a D^{7♯9}) can also be heard in Pink Floyd's "Breathe", and more prominently in "Shine On You Crazy Diamond", both before and after the final guitar solo, before the vocals come in.

The chord is favored by Pixies lead guitarist Joey Santiago, with D^{7♯9}, reminiscent of the opening to "A Hard Day's Night", opening and being called the "secret ingredient" of the song "Here Comes Your Man". A "brutally scraped" F^{7♯9} features in the chorus of "Tame" against the three chord rhythm guitar part's D, C, and F chords.

Use as a primary or tonic chord in funk and disco of the 1970s includes Heatwave's "Boogie Nights".

Stevie Ray Vaughan, a devotee of Hendrix, used the chord extensively. For example, the main riff of his song "Scuttle Buttin'" uses both the E^{7♯9} and the B^{7♯9} as part of a 12-bar blues progression.

Johnny Winter referred to it as the "Hold It" chord after the Bill Doggett song. This was also a name used by John Scofield.
