= Seventh (chord) =

Chord factor

In a chord, the seventh factor is the note seven scale degrees above the root (including the root itself in the count). For instance, in a G dominant seventh chord (G^{7}), the seventh factor is the note F.

When the seventh is the bass note (i.e., the lowest note) of the seventh chord, the chord is in third inversion .

Conventionally, the seventh is fourth in importance to the root, fifth, and third, with third inversion being the third strongest inversion and the seventh variably minor or major.

== In jazz ==
In jazz chords and theory, and classical music theory, the seventh is what defines a chord as a "seventh chord". Moreover, most triads that appear in lead sheets or fake books can have sevenths added to them, using the performer's discretion and "ear". For example, if a tune is in the key of C, if there is a G chord, the chord-playing performer will usually "voice" this chord as G7. While in a strict classical music context, the notes of a G7 chord would be "G–B–D–F", in jazz, the fifth of the chord is often omitted. The root is also often omitted if playing in a jazz group, as it will usually be played by the bassist. Omitting the root and fifth gives the improvising chord-playing musician the option to play other notes.

In voicing jazz chords, performers focus first on the seventh and the major or minor third of the chord, with the latter indicating the chord quality, along with added chord extensions (e.g., elevenths, even if not indicated in the lead sheet or fake book) to add tone "colour" to the chord. As such, a jazz guitarist or jazz piano player might "voice" a printed G chord with the notes "B–E–F–A", which would be the third, sixth (a.k.a. 13th), seventh, and ninth of the chord. Jazz chord-playing musicians may also add altered chord tones (e.g., #11) and added tones. An example of an altered dominant chord in the key of C, built on a G would be to voice the chord as "B–C♯–E–F–A♭"; this would be G7 (b9,#11).

== Types ==
The seventh note of a chord is most commonly a minor seventh (in C, B♭) or major seventh interval (in C, B♮). Less often, the seventh note of a chord is diminished or augmented (B=A (enharmonic notes) or B♯=C (also enharmonic notes).

== Resolution ==
In the common practice period the "strict resolution" the chord's seventh degree is stepwise downward. For example, the seventh of the dominant seventh chord, resolving to tonic, moves downward to the third of the following chord. In the key of C major, the dominant seventh chord would be G^{7}; the seventh note of this G^{7} chord is F, which should resolve downwards to an E in the next bar (typically supported by a C-major chord).
