= Added tone chord =

Chord made of a tertian triad and a miscellaneous fourth note

C sus2 chord and C minor add2 chord. Both have the non-triad tone D. They are distinguished by the presence or absence of the third (E♭).

An added tone chord, or added note chord, is a non-tertian chord composed of a triad and one or more extra "added" notes. Any tone that is not a seventh is commonly categorized as an added tone. It can be outside the tertian sequence of ascending thirds from the root, such as the added sixth or fourth, or it can be in a chord that does not consist of a continuous stack of thirds, such as the added thirteenth (six thirds from the root, but the chord does not have the previous tertian notes – the seventh, ninth or eleventh). The concept of added tones is convenient in that all notes may be related to familiar chords.

Inversions of added tone chords where the added tone is the bass note are usually simply notated as slash chords instead of added tone chords. For example, instead of C^{add2}/D, just C/D is used.

An added tone such as fourth voiced below the root may suggest polytonality. The practice of adding tones may have led to superimposing chords and tonalities, though added tone chords have most often been used as more intense substitutes for traditional chords.

== Added tone chords ==
=== Added second or ninth chords ===
Ninth (C^{9}) vs added-ninth chord (C^{add9}), distinguished by the presence or absence of a seventh.

An added second chord (or add2 chord) or added ninth chord (or add9 chord) is a major or minor triad with the note a major second or major ninth, respectively, above the root. For example, the add2 chord built on C, notated as C^{add2}, has pitches C–D–E–G:

Since this is the same pitch class, the difference is the voicing of the added note within the chord.

Examples in popular music include The Rolling Stones' "You Can't Always Get What You Want", Mr. Mister's "Broken Wings", Don Henley's "The End of the Innocence", The Police's "Every Breath You Take", Cheap Trick's "The Flame", Lionel Richie's "All Night Long (All Night)", Men at Work's "It's a Mistake", DeBarge's "Rhythm of the Night", Starship's "We Built This City", Deniece Williams' "Let's Hear It for the Boy", and The Beatles' "A Hard Day's Night". The jazz rock group Steely Dan popularized a particular voicing of the add2 chord they dubbed the mu chord.

=== Added fourth chord ===
An added fourth chord (or add4 chord) is a major or minor triad with the note a perfect fourth above the root. For example, the add4 chord built on C, notated as C^{add4}, has pitches C–E–F–G:

Add4 chords are almost always built on the fifth scale degree where the added note is the key's tonic note. Examples in popular music include the second chord in the verse of "Runaway Train" and the introduction of The Who's "Baba O'Riley".

=== Added sixth chord ===
The added sixth chord (or add6 chord) is a major or minor triad with the note a major or minor sixth above the root. For example, the add6 chord built on C, notated as C^{6}, has pitches C–E–G–A:

Added sixth chords are rarely inverted since it shares its notes with a seventh chord a minor third down (e.g. C^{6} has the same notes as an Am^{7}), although a counterexample is The 5th Dimension's recorded version of "Stoned Soul Picnic" (on 5).

It is used only occasionally in rock and popular music, but examples include the third measure of The Beatles' "A Hard Day's Night", the second chord of "You Keep Me Hangin' On", the third of "The Eagle And The Hawk", and The Beatles' "She Loves You". When added at the suggestion of George Harrison, producer George Martin described the chord as old-fashioned sounding. An added-sixth chord ends songs including Hank Williams' "Hey Good Lookin'", Chuck Berry's "Rock and Roll Music", Sam Cooke's "You Send Me", and The Beatles' "She Loves You".

=== 6/9 chord ===
A 6/9 chord is a major triad with the notes a major sixth and major ninth above the root. For example, the 6/9 chord built on C, notated as C^{6/9}, has pitches C–E–G–A–D:

It is not a tense chord requiring resolution and is considered a substitute for the tonic in jazz.

The minor 6/9 chord is a minor triad with an added sixth and ninth, evoking the Dorian mode and is also suitable as a minor tonic in jazz.

== Mixed third chords ==
A mixed third chord (also split-third chord) includes both the major and minor thirds (e.g. C–E♭–E♮–G), although the thirds are usually separated by an octave or more.

A minor chord above a major chord of the same root has a diminished octave (major seventh) separating the thirds and is more common, while a major chord above a minor chord of the same root has a very dissonant augmented octave (minor ninth) separating the thirds and is not as commonplace. Paul McCartney's "Maybe I'm Amazed" is an example of the use of a split-third chord, as are many of William Schuman's symphonies. It is also suggested by the final note and chord of "A Hard Day's Night".

Mixed thirds caused by blue notes in blues, country music and rock music can be thought to form mixed third chords, such as in Chuck Berry's "Rock And Roll Music". The dominant seventh sharp ninth chord's major third and augmented ninth are enharmonically equivalent to a minor-over-major chord's thirds, and the two can be somewhat interchangeable. Songs with a 7♯9 chord include "Purple Haze" and "Boogie Nights".

== See also ==
- Blue note
- False relation
- Nine-six chord
