= Major chord =

Chord having a root, a major third, and a perfect fifth

major triad
Component intervals from root
- perfect fifth
- major third

Tuning
- just - 4:5:6

Forte no.
- 3-11

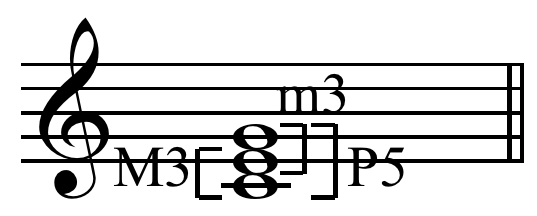
A major triad has a major third on the bottom, a minor third on top, and a perfect fifth between the outer notes.

A major chord is a triad with a major third and a perfect fifth above the root. The major chord above C is spelled C–E–G.

== Structure ==
The primary intervals in a major chord are the major third between the first and second notes, the perfect fifth between the first and third notes, and the minor third between the second and third notes. It is a tertian chord, because it is built in thirds. When the root of the chord is not in the bass, the chord is considered inverted. In integer notation, a major triad is {0,4,7}.

On lead sheets, a major chord is indicated by the letter of its root (and any relevant accidental).

The major chord timbre is sometimes described as brighter than its minor counterpart.

== Just intonation ==
The just major triad is composed of three tones in whole number ratios 4:5:6.

In just intonation, a major chord is tuned to the frequency ratio 4:5:6. The just major scale contains major triads at I, IV, and V. In equal temperament, the fifth is two cents narrower than the just perfect fifth, and the major third is 14 cents narrower than the just major third.

== See also ==
- Major and minor
- Musical tuning
- Minor chord
- Otonality and utonality
