= Suspended chord =

Musical chord in which the (major or minor) third is omitted

A C major triad, followed by two suspended chords without the third: C^{sus4} and C^{sus2}.

A suspended chord (or sus chord) is a musical chord in which the third is replaced by a dissonant tone like a perfect fourth or a major second. The resulting sound is tonally ambiguous. The practice is widespread in popular music.

== Definition ==
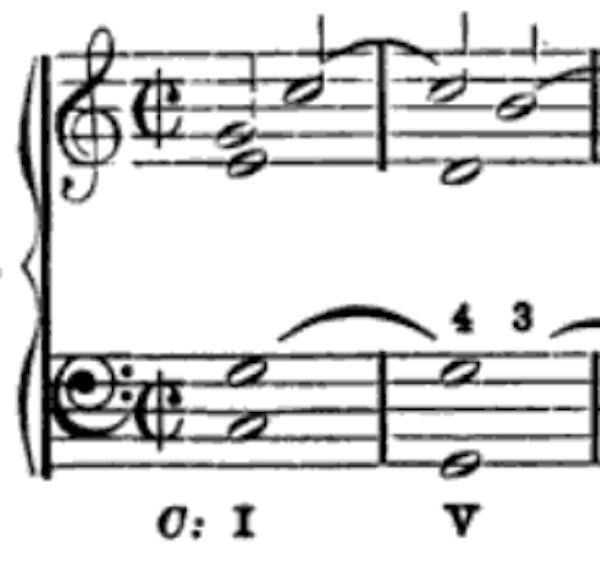
A 4-3 suspension in C major. The upper C in the first bar is suspended into the second, where it becomes a dissonance against the G major chord. The melody steps down to B, and the suspended 4th becomes the 3rd of the chord.

The term derives from suspensions in counterpoint, where tones of a previous chord are suspended into the next harmony. The suspension creates a dissonance which must be resolved. A common suspension is a fourth above the root resolving to the third of the chord. Sevenths, ninths, and seconds are also common suspensions.

As tonality expanded, classical composers began embracing less functional harmony structured in fourths and fifths. In popular music, it also became commonplace to leave suspensions in place without resolving them. Popular musicians further dispensed with the requirement that the suspended note originate in the preceding harmony. Suspended chords are commonly nicknamed "sus chords". In chord notation, a number is added to indicate the suspended note, for instance C^{sus4}. The absence of the third creates an ambiguous, open sound.

== Usage ==
=== Popular music ===
Suspended chords are commonly found in folk and popular music. Keith Richards makes extensive use of suspended chords in his preferred open tuning for guitar. He found it integral to his songwriting, "I learned there is often one note doing something that makes the whole thing work. It's usually a suspended chord. It's not a full chord, it's a mixture of chords, which I love to use to this day. If you're playing a straight chord, whatever comes next should have something else in it. If it's an A chord, a hint of D. Or if it's a song with a different feeling, if it's an A chord, a hint of G should come in somewhere, which makes a 7th, which then can lead you on." Joni Mitchell also favored suspended chords because, "so much in my life was unresolved from 'when were they going to drop the big one?' to 'where is my daughter?' that I had to use unresolved chords to convey my unresolved questions".

The Beatles' "The Long and Winding Road" is full of "heartbreaking suspensions", according to Ian MacDonald. "Yes It Is" also relies on suspensions to create a "rich and unusual harmonic motion". The instrumental opening to The Four Tops’ song "Reach Out I'll Be There" (1966) features an E chord containing a suspended fourth, resolved immediately by being followed by an E minor chord. Burt Bacharach's "The Look of Love" in the arrangement performed by Dusty Springfield (1967) opens with a clearly audible Dm7 suspension.

Pete Townshend opens "Pinball Wizard" with a suspended four chord that resolves to the tonic. It is one of the signature motifs of Tommy. Songs with prominent suspended chords that do not resolve include The Police's "Every Breath You Take", Shocking Blue's "Venus", and Chicago's "Make Me Smile". Noel Gallagher relies heavily on suspended chords in Oasis songs like "Champagne Supernova" and "Wonderwall".

=== Jazz ===
G^{9sus4} chord

A common suspended chord in jazz combines the supertonic and dominant chords into one sonority: V^{9sus4}.

Red Garland ends his piano introduction to "Bye Bye Blackbird" on the Miles Davis album 'Round About Midnight with a series of suspended chords.

Suspended chords are a common feature of modal jazz, which emerged in the 1960s. McCoy Tyner played them frequently. Herbie Hancock described the structural chord of his 1965 tune "Maiden Voyage" as "a 7th chord with the 11th on the bottom—a 7th chord with a suspended 4th". Instead of resolving the way such a tall chord would in functional harmony, Hancock simply transposes the chord up a minor third, "It doesn't have any cadences; it just keeps moving around in a circle."

== See also ==
- Added tone chord
- Sixth chord
