= Forte number =

Classification of pitch class sets

Set 3-1 has three possible rotations/inversions; the normal form (left) is the most compact, corresponding to the smallest sector

In musical set theory, a Forte number is the pair of numbers Allen Forte assigned to the prime form of each pitch class set of three or more members in The Structure of Atonal Music (1973, ISBN 0-300-02120-8). The first number indicates the number of pitch classes in the pitch class set and the second number indicates the set's sequence in Forte's ordering of all pitch class sets containing that number of pitches.

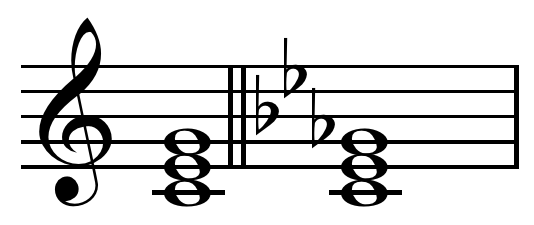
Major and minor chords on C.

In the 12-TET tuning system (or in any other system of tuning that splits the octave into twelve semitones), each pitch class may be denoted by an integer in the range from 0 to 11 (inclusive), and a pitch class set may be denoted by a set of these integers. The prime form of a pitch class set is the most compact (i.e., leftwards packed or smallest in lexicographic order) of either the normal form of a set or of its inversion. The normal form of a set is that which is transposed so as to be most compact. For example, a second inversion major chord contains the pitch classes 7, 0, and 4. The normal form would then be 0, 4, and 7. Its (transposed) inversion, which happens to be the minor chord, contains the pitch classes 0, 3, and 7; and is the prime form.

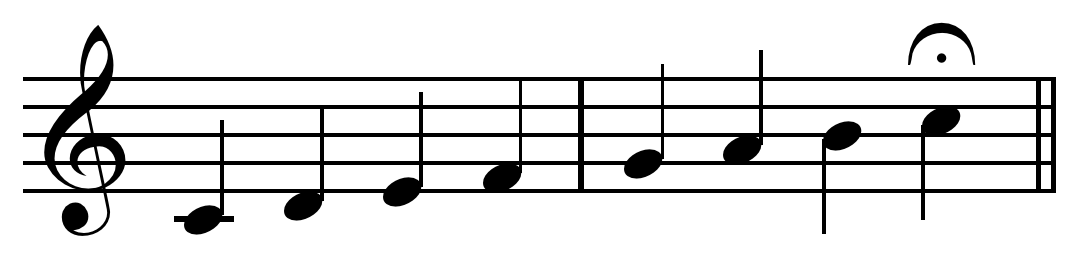
C major diatonic scale.

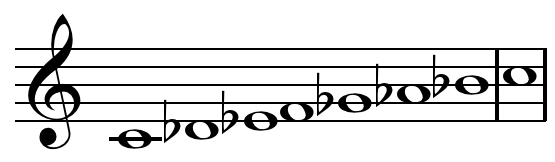
Locrian mode on C.

The major and minor chords are both given Forte number 3-11, indicating that it is the eleventh in Forte's ordering of pitch class sets with three pitches. In contrast, the Viennese trichord, with pitch classes 0, 1, and 6, is given Forte number 3-5, indicating that it is the fifth in Forte's ordering of pitch class sets with three pitches. The normal form of the diatonic scale, such as C major; 0, 2, 4, 5, 7, 9, and 11; is 11, 0, 2, 4, 5, 7, and 9; while its prime form is 0, 1, 3, 5, 6, 8, and 10; and its Forte number is 7-35, indicating that it is the thirty-fifth of the seven-member pitch class sets.

Sets of pitches which share the same Forte number have identical interval vectors. Those that have different Forte numbers have different interval vectors with the exception of z-related sets (for example 6-Z44 and 6-Z19).

== Calculation ==
There are two prevailing methods of computing prime form. The first was described by Forte, and the second was introduced in John Rahn's Basic Atonal Theory and used in Joseph N. Straus's Introduction to Post-Tonal Theory, and is now generally more popular. For example, the Forte prime form for 6-31 is [0_{1}1_{2}3_{2}5_{3}8_{1}9_{3}] whereas the Rahn algorithm chooses [0_{1}1_{3}4_{1}5_{2}7_{2}9_{3}], where adjacency intervals are shown here by subscripts between pitch-class numerals. As seen, both versions of this set class have one of their largest adjacency intervals (3 semitones) at the right—i.e. they both have the smallest possible span—but, within that span, Forte chooses the version that is then most packed towards the left, whereas Rahn chooses the version that is most dispersed away from the right.

In the language of combinatorics, the Forte numbers correspond to the binary bracelets of length 12: that is, equivalence classes of binary sequences of length 12 under the operations of cyclic permutation and reversal. In this correspondence, a one in a binary sequence corresponds to a pitch that is present in a pitch class set, and a zero in a binary sequence corresponds to a pitch that is absent. The rotation of binary sequences corresponds to transposition of chords, and the reversal of binary sequences corresponds to inversion of chords. The most compact form of a pitch class set is the lexicographically maximal sequence within the corresponding equivalence class of sequences.

Elliott Carter had earlier (1960–1967) produced a numbered listing of pitch class sets, or "chords", as Carter referred to them, for his own use.

== See also ==
- List of set classes
