= Root (chord) =

Musical note characterizing a chord

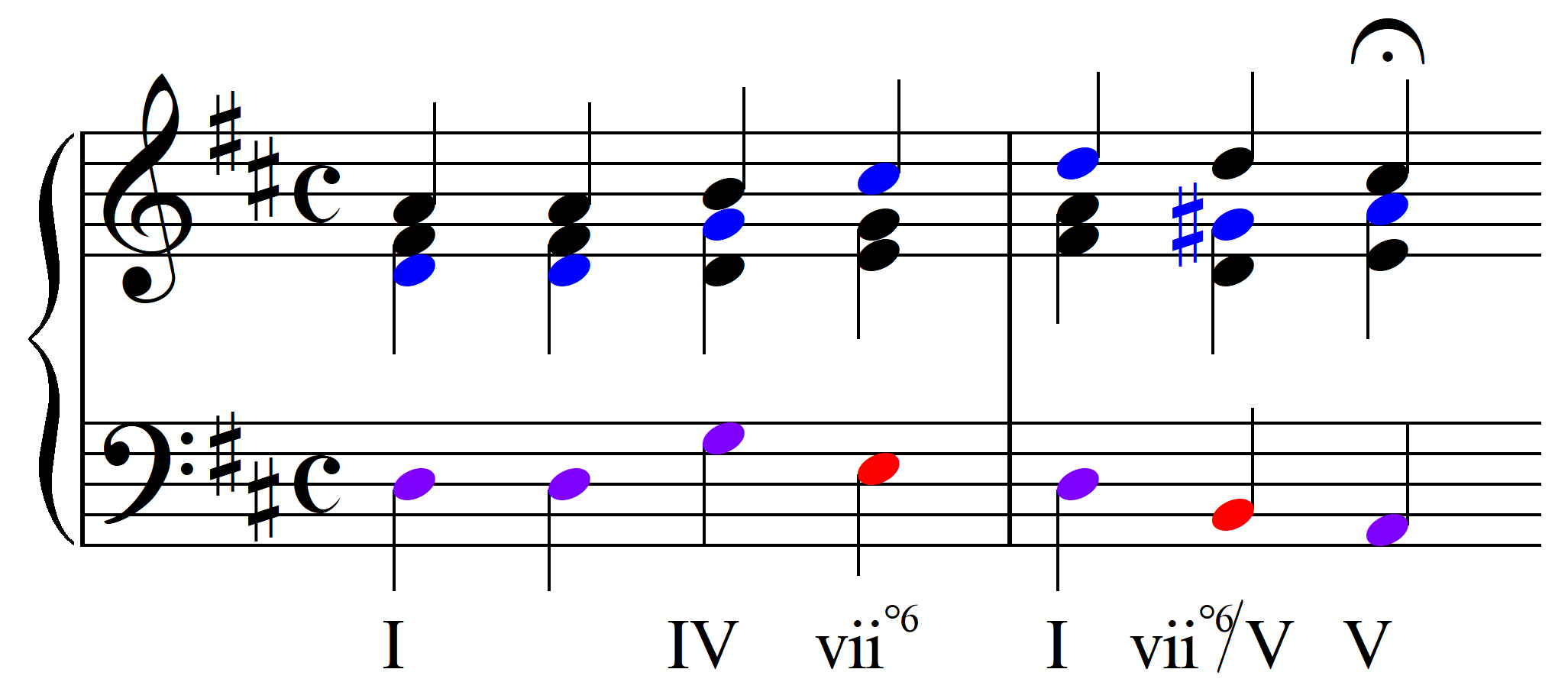
Root notes (blue) and bass notes (red, both=purple) from an 18th-century Chorale

In music theory, the root of a chord is the note that names and typifies the chord. Tertian chords are named based on (1) their root, (2) their quality (assumed to be major if no quality is named), and (3) their extensions, if any (assumed to be a triad if no extensions are named). For example, a C chord refers to a C major triad, a major triad built on the note C, which is its root.

The root of a tertian chord is the note on which the subsequent thirds are stacked (though on occasion, some of the notes in the stack may be omitted). For instance, the root of the E minor triad is E, independent of the vertical placement of the three notes that compose it (i.e., E, G, and B).

== Root vs. bass note ==
The root of a chord need not be its bass note (i.e., its lowest note). If the root is the bass note, then the chord is said to be in root position; otherwise, it is an inverted chord. A triad can be in three possible positions: (1) root position, with its root in the bass; (2) first inversion, with its third in the bass; or (3) second inversion, with its fifth in the bass. In the music below, the root of each triad is shown in red.

Seventh chords and chords with higher extensions can similarly be inverted.

== Identifying the root ==
Tertian chords are chords that are constructed by stacking thirds—typically, major and minor thirds. They include traditional triads, like major and minor triads, as well as seventh chords and extended chords. To identify the root of a tertian chord, reorganize the pitches as a stack of thirds and then identify the lowest note in the stack. This note is the root of the chord. On occasion, some of the notes in the stack may be omitted—the fifth of the chord is the most common note to be omitted—but the rest of the stack will still be present, so the root can still be found.

Suspended chords are non-tertian chords composed of a traditional triad with a note replacing a note one of the triad's notes, while added note chords are non-tertian chords composed of a traditional triad with an added note. Examples include suspended two chords (i.e., sus2 chords), suspended four chords (i.e., sus4 chords), added second chords (i.e., add2 chords), and added sixth chords (i.e., add6 chords). To identify the root of such a chord, identify the triad that has been modified and then find its root.

== History ==
The first mentions of the relation of inversion between triads appears in Otto Sigfried Harnish's Artis musicae (1608), which describes perfect triads in which the lower note of the fifth is expressed in its own position, and imperfect ones, in which the base (i.e., the root) of the chord appears only higher. Johannes Lippius, in his Disputatio musica tertia (1610) and Synopsis musicae novae (1612), is the first to use the term "triad" (trias harmonica); he also uses the term "root" (radix), but in a slightly different meaning. Thomas Campion's A New Way of Making Fowre Parts in Conterpoint (c. 1618) notes that when chords are in first inversion (sixths), the bass is not "a true base", which is implicitly a third lower. Campion's "true base" is the root of the chord.

Full recognition of the relationship between the triad and its inversions is generally credited to Jean-Philippe Rameau and his Treatise on Harmony (1722). Rameau was not the first to discover triadic inversion, but his main achievement is to have recognized the importance of the succession of roots (or of chords identified by their roots) for the construction of tonality.

== See also ==
- Figured bass
