= Jazz harmony =

Harmonic music theory as it applies to Jazz

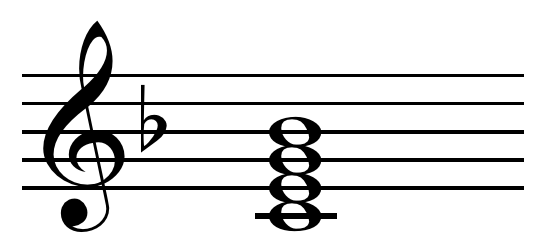
Dominant seventh chord on C: C^{7}.

Jazz harmony is the theory and practice of how chords are used in jazz music. While jazz bears certain similarities to other practices in the tradition of Western harmony, such as many chord progressions and the incorporation of the major and minor scales as a basis for chordal construction, other characteristics such as modality, syntax and phrase structure separate it from Western tradition. In jazz, chords are often arranged vertically in major or minor thirds, although stacked fourths are also quite common. Also, jazz music tends to favor certain harmonic progressions and includes the addition of tensions, intervals such as 9ths, 11ths, and 13ths to chords. Additionally, scales unique to style are used as the basis of many harmonic elements found in jazz. Jazz harmony is notable for the use of seventh chords as the basic harmonic unit more often than triads, as in classical music. In the words of Robert Rawlins and Nor Eddine Bahha, "7th chords provide the building blocks of jazz harmony."

The piano and guitar are the two instruments that provide harmony for a jazz group. Players of these instruments deal with harmony in a real-time, flowing context as a matter of course. This is one of the challenges in jazz.

In a big-band context, the harmony is the basis for horn material, melodic counterpoint, and so on. The improvising soloist is expected to have a complete knowledge of the basics of harmony, as well as their own unique approach to chords and their relationship to scales. A personal style is composed of these building blocks and a rhythmic concept.

Jazz composers use harmony as a basic stylistic element as well. Open, modal harmony is characteristic of the music of McCoy Tyner, whereas rapidly shifting key centers is a hallmark of the middle period of John Coltrane's writing. Horace Silver, Clare Fischer, Dave Brubeck, and Bill Evans are pianists whose compositions are more typical of the chord-rich style associated with pianist-composers. Joe Henderson, Woody Shaw, Wayne Shorter and Benny Golson are non-pianists who also have a strong sense of the role of harmony in compositional structure and mood. These composers (including also Dizzy Gillespie and Charles Mingus, who recorded infrequently as pianists) have musicianship grounded in chords at the piano, even though they are not performing keyboardists.

The authentic cadence (V-I) is the most important one in both classical and jazz harmony, though in jazz it more often follows a ii or II chord serving as predominant. To cite Rawlins and Bahha, as above: "The ii-V-I [progression] provides the cornerstone of jazz harmony"

The ii-V-I may appear differently in major or minor keys, m7-dom-maj7 or m7♭5-dom♭9-minor.

Other central features of jazz harmony are diatonic and non-diatonic reharmonizations, the addition of the V7(sus4) chord as a dominant and non-dominant functioning chord, major/minor interchange, blues harmony, secondary dominants, extended dominants, deceptive resolution, related ii-V7 chords, direct modulations, the use of contrafacts, common chord modulations, and dominant chord modulations using ii-V progressions.

Bebop or "straight-ahead" jazz, in which only certain of all possible extensions and alterations are used, is distinguished from free, avant-garde, or post-bop jazz harmony.

== Harmonic Structure ==
Though harmonic structure of jazz remains difficult to categorize due to its many variations and evolutions, it does contain certain patterns that appear frequently throughout its history. Some of these patterns involve functional harmony, with many similarities to traditional Western harmony. Others include what is referred to as nonfunctional "coloring harmony".

As mentioned above, the authentic cadence (V-I) is essential to jazz harmony, with the V chords often being preceded with a predominant ii chord. Throughout the bebop and hard bop eras of jazz, this was the main harmonic paradigm, with additional chords acting as a prolongation for an ultimate global tonic. This type of harmonic structure echoes that of mid-century pop and show tunes, from which much of the jazz standard repertoire is drawn. The structure of a jazz tune will often use the ii-V-I and other prolongations/preparations to tonicize certain notes while still maintaining a tonality based in one key center. For example, the popular John Coltrane tune "Giant Steps" moves through many keys using ii-V-I's as setups to tonicize Eb, G, and B, while still maintaining a tonality in the key of Eb throughout the whole piece. "Have You Met Miss Jones", a Rodgers and Hammerstein show tune canonized in the Great American Songbook, features a bridge that tonicizes a series of notes separated by major thirds using ii-V-I's in a similar manner to Giant Steps.

In addition to functional harmonic movement, jazz utilizes many patterns of nonfunctional harmony, characterized by coloring and voice leading techniques. Not all chords in this style adhere to standards functional interpretations, instead serving to "color" the harmony with timbre-like effects. This type of harmonic construction can be found in the music of Wayne Shorter, Charles Mingus, and Thelonious Monk. While these chords may not represent a standard functional relationship to a tonic, they still produce a sonic relationship that can be mixed with the hierarchical chord relationships of preparation and prolongation that make up functional jazz harmony. An example of this is the use of a traditional progression like Eb to Ab, but using a suspended fourth with a dominant instead of a third to increase prolongation (Eb7sus to Ab7sus). This is a characteristic of what is often referred to as modal jazz, associated with many musicians of the post-bop era including Miles Davis, Herbie Hancock, and McCoy Tyner.

== Chord symbols ==
Analytic practice in Jazz recognizes four basic chord types, plus diminished seventh chords. The four basic chord types are major, minor, minor-major, and dominant. When written in a jazz chart, these chords may have alterations specified in parentheses after the chord symbol. An altered note is a note which is a deviation from the canonical chord tone.

There is variety in the chord symbols used in jazz notation. A jazz musician must have facility in the alternate notation styles which are used. The following chord symbol examples use C as a root tone for example purposes.

| Equivalent symbols | Chord tones in example key | Name | Audio |
|---|---|---|---|
| CΔ, CM7, Cmaj7 | C E G B | major seventh chord |
| C7 | C E G B♭ | dominant seventh chord |
| C-7, Cm7 | C E♭ G B♭ | minor seventh chord |
| C-Δ7, CmM7, C⑦ | C E♭ G B | minor/major seventh chord |
| C∅, Cm7♭5, C-7♭5 | C E♭ G♭ B♭ | half-diminished seventh chord |
| C^{o}7, Cdim7 | C E♭ G♭ B | fully diminished 7th chord |
| C7sus | C F G B♭ | dominant or minor suspended 4th chord |

Most jazz chord symbols designate four notes. Each typically has a "role" as root, third, fifth, or seventh, although they may be severely altered and possibly use an enharmonic spelling which masks this underlying identity. For example, jazz harmony theoretician Jim Knapp has suggested that the ♭9 and even the ♯9 alterations are functioning in the root role.

The jazz chord naming system is as deterministic as the composer wishes it to be. A rule of thumb is that chord alterations are included in a chart only when the alteration appears in the melody or is crucial to essence of the composition. Skilled improvisers are able to supply an idiomatic, highly altered harmonic vocabulary even when written chord symbols contain no alterations.

It is possible to specify chords with more than four notes. For example, the chord C-Δ9 contains the notes (C E♭ G B D).

== Melodic Minor Scale ==
Much of jazz harmony is based on the melodic minor scale (using only the "ascending" scale as defined in classical harmony). The modes of this scale are the basis for much jazz improvisation and are variously named as below, using the key of C-minor as an example:

| Melodic minor scale tone | Characteristic chord in C-minor | Scale tones (chord tones in bold) | Scale name(s) |
|---|---|---|---|
| I - C | Cm(∆) | **C** D **E♭** F **G** A **B** | Melodic Minor |
| II - D | Dm7 | **D** E♭ **F** G **A** B **C** | Phrygian ♯6 or Dorian ♭2 |
| III - E♭ | E♭∆(♯5) | **E♭** F **G** A **B** C **D** | Lydian ♯5 or Lydian Augmented |
| IV - F | F7 | **F** G **A** B **C** D **E♭** | Mixolydian ♯4 or Lydian Dominant |
| V - G | G7 | **G** A **B** C **D** E♭ **F** | Mixolydian ♭6 or "Hindu" |
| VI - A | A∅ | **A** B **C** D **E♭** F **G** | Locrian ♯2 |
| VII - B | B7alt | **B** C **D** E♭ **F** G **A** | Altered, diminished whole tone, or Locrian ♭4 |

The VII chord in particular is rich with alterations. As it contains the notes and alterations (I, ♭9, m3/♯9, M3, ♭5/♯11, ♭13, m7), it is particularly important in the jazz harmonic idiom, notably as a V chord in a minor key. For our example key of C-minor, the V chord is G7, so the improviser would draw upon the G7 altered scale (mode VII of the A♭ melodic minor). A complete ii-V-i progression in C-minor7 extended 9 flattened fifth might suggest the following:

| ii | D∅ | D Locrian ♯2 (mode VI of the F melodic minor scale) |
| V | G7(alt) | G altered scale (mode VII of the A♭ melodic minor scale) |
| I | Cm(∆) | C melodic minor (mode I of the C melodic minor scale) |

== See also ==
- Altered chord
- Bebop scale
- Chord-scale system
- Modal jazz
- Tritone substitution
