= Jazz chord =

Chords used in jazz music

Major seventh chord on C, notated as C^{Δ7}

Jazz chords are chords, chord voicings and chord symbols that jazz musicians commonly use in composition, improvisation, and harmony. In jazz chords and theory, most triads that appear in lead sheets or fake books can have sevenths added to them, using the performer's discretion and ear. For example, if a tune is in the key of C, if there is a G chord, the chord-playing performer usually voices this chord as G^{7}. While the notes of a G^{7} chord are G–B–D–F, jazz often omits the fifth of the chord—and even the root if playing in a group. However, not all jazz pianists leave out the root when they play voicings: Bud Powell, one of the best-known of the bebop pianists, and Horace Silver, whose quintet included many of jazz's biggest names from the 1950s to the 1970s, included the root note in their voicings.

Improvising chord-playing musicians who omit the root and fifth are given the option to play other notes. For example, if a seventh chord, such as G^{7}, appears in a lead sheet or fake book, many chord-playing performers add the ninth, thirteenth or other notes to the chord, even though the lead sheet does not specify these additional notes. Jazz players can add these additional, upper notes because they can create an important part of the jazz sound. Lead sheets and fake books often do not detail how to voice the chord because a lead sheet or fake book is only intended to provide basic guide to the harmony. An experienced comping performer playing electric guitar or piano may add or remove notes as chosen according to the style and desired sound of that musician, but must do so in a way that still emphasizes the correct musical context for other musicians and listeners.

In voicing jazz chords while in a group setting, performers focus first on the seventh and the major or minor third of the chord, with the latter indicating the chord quality, along with added chord extensions (e.g., elevenths, even if not indicated in the lead sheet or fake book) to add tone "colour" to the chord. As such, a jazz guitarist or jazz piano player might "voice" a printed G^{7} chord with the notes B–E–F–A, which would be the third, sixth (thirteenth), flat seventh, and ninth of the chord. Jazz chord-playing musicians may also add altered chord tones (e.g., ♯11) and added tones. An example of an altered dominant chord in the key of C, built on a G would be to voice the chord as "B–C♯–E–F–A♭"; this would be G^{7(♭9♯11)}.

== Nomenclature ==
=== Intervals ===
Each chord is described as a series of intervallic relationships to the root of the chord. This provides an accurate and easily understandable basis for working out these chords in each key.

The terms used to describe intervals are as follows:

- r = root of the chord (while the root is widely used in classical music, pop music and rock music chord voicings, in jazz, the root is often omitted by the chord-playing performer(s))
- ♭2 = minor second = 1 semitone (half step) above the root
- 2 = major second = 2 semitones above root
- ♯2 = augmented second = 3 semitones above the root
- ♭3 = minor third = 3 semitones above the root
- 3 = major third = 4 semitones above the root
- 4 = perfect fourth = 5 semitones above the root
- ♯4 = augmented fourth (tritone) = 6 semitones above the root
- ♭5 = diminished fifth (tritone) = 6 semitones above the root
- 5 = perfect fifth = 7 semitones above the root (while the fifth is widely used in classical music, pop music and rock music chord voicings, in jazz, the fifth is often omitted by the chord-playing performer(s))
- ♯5 = augmented fifth = 8 semitones above the root
- ♭6 = minor sixth = 8 semitones above the root
- 6 = major sixth = 9 semitones above the root
- 7 = minor seventh = 10 semitones above the root
- M7 or maj7 = major seventh = 11 semitones above the root

All root chords are described starting with the lowest note, and ascending in pitch. For instance, a chord described as

root, ♭3, ♭5.

contains the root, a minor third above the root, and a diminished fifth above the root. It is a diminished triad. If this chord were built on B (with B as the root), it would contain the notes

B, D, F.

==== Compound intervals ====
Compound intervals are intervals larger than an octave; they can also be described as an octave plus a simple interval. Note that this is not a complete list of compound intervals, only those that are commonly used in jazz chords.

- ♭9 = compound minor second (minor ninth) = 1 semitone + an octave = 13 semitones above the root
- 9 = compound major second (ninth) = 2 semitones + an octave = 14 semitones above the root
- ♯9/♭10 = compound augmented second/minor third (augmented ninth/minor tenth) = 3 semitones + an octave = 15 semitones above the root.
- 10 = compound major third (tenth) = 4 semitones + an octave = 16 semitones above the root
- 11 = compound perfect fourth (eleventh) = 5 semitones + an octave = 17 semitones above the root
- ♯11 = compound augmented fourth (augmented eleventh) = 6 semitones + an octave = 18 semitones above the root
- ♭13 = compound minor sixth (minor thirteenth) = 8 semitones + an octave = 20 semitones above the root
- 13 = compound major sixth (thirteenth) = 9 semitones + an octave = 21 semitones above the root

=== Extensions ===
Optional extensions to the chords are written in parentheses, e.g. (♯11). These notes are not necessary to define the function of the chord, but are included to add colour or fill out the sound according to the tastes of the performer. Extensions may be written into the chords when a specific colour or texture is warranted, or the chords in a lead sheet or fake book may simply state "C^{7} – A^{7} – D^{7} – G^{7}". This does not mean that the chord-playing performer can only perform four-note dominant seventh chords. Chord-playing performers can use their ear, their sense of good taste acquired from listening to jazz, and their knowledge of the style of the tune being played (e.g., is it a bebop tune or a jazz fusion tune) to help guide their use of extension notes, altered extensions, and added tones. In a band, the bandleader might request that certain voicings be used (e.g., ♭9/♯11) or request that certain other voicings be avoided (e.g., ♭13), due to the bandleader's taste.

=== Voicings ===
Chords are described here in terms of intervals relative to the root of the chord, arranged from smaller intervals to larger. This is a standard method used when describing jazz chords as it shows them hierarchically: Lower intervals (third, fifth and seventh) are more important in defining the function of the chord than the upper intervals or extensions (9th, 11th, 13th), which add color. Although it is possible to play the chords as described here literally, it is possible to use different orderings of the same notes, known as a voicings, or even by omitting certain notes.

C^{13(♯11)}

For instance, the dominant seventh ♯11 or Lydian dominant, C^{7♯11}, comprises the notes:

root (often omitted), 3, (5), 7, (9), ♯11, (13).

Basing this chord on the pitch, C, results in the pitches:

C (often omitted), E, G, B♭, D, F♯, A.

The same chord type may also be voiced:

C (often omitted), E, B♭, F♯, A, D, F♯.

This voicing omits both the root and the perfect fifth (G) and raises the major ninth (D) by an octave. The augmented eleventh (F♯) is also played twice in two different registers. This is known as "doubling".

== Chord types ==
=== Basic chord types ===
The above chords, despite their differences, share the same harmonic function and can be used interchangeably.

==== Major chords ====
Major seventh chord on C i.e. C^{Δ7}

A major seventh chord contains the notes:

root, 3, 5, M7, (9).

The symbols ^{M7} and ^{Δ7} have the same meaning as maj^{7} or just ^{Δ}. Often melody notes or other pitches influence an improviser's choice of chord types. For example, if the melody note is the root of the chord, including a major seventh can cause dissonance.

Major sixth chord on C i.e. C^{6}

A major sixth chord contains the notes:

root (often omitted), 3, 5, 6.

Major 6/9 chord on C i.e. C^{6/9}

A 6/9 chord (C^{6/9} or C^{6add9}) contains the notes:

root (often omitted), 3, 5, 6, 9.

Lydian chord on C i.e. C^{Δ♯11}

A Lydian chord (C^{Δ♯11}) contains the notes:

root (often omitted), 3, 5, M7, (9), ♯11 (13).

The Lydian chord has a strange quirk, where if the root is put both above and below the augmented eleventh it creates an unpleasant dissonance of a tritone. This is not usually a problem in a jazz context, as chord-playing musicians often omit the root.

The interval of the sixth is used, even though it is described after other compound intervals and perhaps should also be a compound interval (i.e., 13th). However, a convention in jazz dictates that when describing the major sixth, generally use the simple interval, i.e., 6 is often used instead of the compound interval, i.e., 13. This helps avoid confusion with the dominant thirteenth chord.

==== Basic dominant chords ====
The term basic can be used to describe dominant chords based on the major scale. In many instances, dominant chords written as basic chords (e.g., G^{7}) can substitute for more complex chords, as long as they remain part of the same group (i.e., dominant chords) and do not clash with the melody notes.

Dominant chords are considered to sound unstable in classical music harmony contexts, and so in a classical piece, these chords often resolve down a perfect fifth or up a perfect fourth (e.g. G^{7} tends to resolve onto chords based on C, such as C suspended 4 or C major ninth). However, in a jazz context, particularly in music from the 1940s bebop era and later decades, dominant chords were no longer treated as "unstable" chords. Some bebop tunes use a dominant chord as the tonic chord and also use dominant chords for the chords that would typically be minor chords in a classical piece or a swing arrangement. For example, while a classical piece and a swing arrangement might use the following chord sequence in the key of C major: "C – Am – Dm – G^{7}", a bebop bandleader might reharmonize the same progression as "C^{7} – A^{7} – D^{7} – G^{7}", making a sequence of dominant seventh chords, so long as the new dominant chord harmonies were compatible with the tune's melody. For more details, see chord progression.

Many of the chordal alterations used in jazz are derived from minor scale modes, as opposed to the major scale modes. (See musical mode.) If the performer retains the 13th in the chord and/or avoids playing a ♭13th, it can be substituted for a C^{13♭9}. Likewise a C^{9} can often be substituted for a Cmaj^{9♯5}, as long as the 9th is retained or the ♭9th and ♯9th is avoided.

Dominant seventh, ninth, and thirteenth chords on G i.e. G^{7}, G^{9}, and G^{13}

A dominant seventh chord contains the notes:

root (often omitted), 3, 5 (often omitted), 7, (9), (13).

A dominant ninth chord (G^{9}) contains the notes:

root (often omitted), 3, 5 (often omitted), 7, 9, (13).

A dominant thirteenth chord (G^{13}) contains the notes:

root (often omitted), 3, 5 (often omitted), 7, (9), 13.

This symbol is often used if the 13th is found in the melody.

Sus chord on C i.e. C^{sus4}

A sus, or suspended, chord (C^{7sus4}) contains the notes:

root, 4, 5, 7, (9), (13).

==== Minor seventh chords ====
Minor seventh, ninth, eleventh, and thirteenth chords on A i.e. Am^{7}, Am^{9}, Am^{11}, Am^{13}

A minor seventh chord (A−^{7}, Amin^{7}, Ami^{7}, or Am^{7}) contains the notes:

root, ♭3, 5, 7, (9), (11), (13).

A minor ninth chord (A−^{9}, Amin^{9}, Ami^{9}, or Am^{9}) contains the notes:

root, ♭3, 5, 7, 9, (11), (13).

A minor eleventh chord (A−^{11}, Amin^{11}, Ami^{11}, or Am^{11}) contains the notes:

root, ♭3, 5, 7, (9), 11, (13).

A minor thirteenth chord (A−^{13}, Amin^{13}, Ami^{13}, or Am^{13}) contains the notes:

root, ♭3, 5, 7, (9), (11), 13.

=== Complex dominant chords ===
Dominant seventh flat nine chord on E i.e. E^{7(♭9)}

Complex dominant chords can be voiced in a great variety of ways, including building the chord on the 3 or 7 (minor seventh). They usually, but not always, resolve to a chord built on an interval a fifth down from the root. Utilizing a tritone substitution, a dominant chord may resolve down a half-step instead. It is not uncommon to express the alteration (usually ♯9, ♭9, or ♯5) in the melody. For expediency, musicians may use the abbreviation "alt"—as in C^{7alt}—to describe the family of dominant chords with altered tones (including the ♭5, ♯5, ♭9, ♯9, ♯11, or ♭13). Notably, all altered tones mentioned above, along with the 3 and ♭7, are present in the melodic minor scale whose root is a half-step above the root of the alt chord (i.e., E♭ melodic minor for D^{7alt}). In other words, the altered scale is the seventh mode of the jazz minor scale. This scale is commonly used to improvise over an altered dominant chord. In the section on basic dominant chords, it was noted that the perfect fifth is often omitted. By altering it with a diminished fifth (♭5) or augmented fifth (♯5), extra tension and dissonance is added, which strengthens the resolution to the I chord.

Dominant ♭9/♭5, Dominant ♯9/♭5, Dominant ♭9/♯5, Dominant ♯9/♯5 chords on G i.e. G^{7(♭9♭5)}, G^{7(♯9♭5)}, G^{7(♭9♯5)}, G^{7(♯9♯5)}. All of these chords can be written as G^{7alt}.

A dominant ♭9/♭5 chord (G^{7(♭5♭9)}) contains the notes:

root (often omitted), 3, ♭5, 7, ♭9.

A dominant ♯9/♭5 chord (G^{7(♭5♯9)}) contains the notes:

root (often omitted), 3, ♭5, 7, ♯9.

A dominant ♭9/♯5 chord (G^{7(♯5♭9)}) contains the notes:

root (often omitted), 3, ♯5, 7, ♭9.

A dominant ♯9/♯5 chord (G^{7(♯5♯9)}) contains the notes:

root (often omitted), 3, ♯5, 7, ♯9.

== Sources ==
=== Further reading ===
- Nettles, Barrie & Graf, Richard (1997). The Chord Scale Theory and Jazz Harmony. Advance Music, ISBN 3-89221-056-X.
- Nettles, B., Graf, R. (1997). The Chord Scale Theory & Jazz Harmony. Germany: Advance Music. ISBN 9783892210566
- Weir, Michele. Jazz Singer's Handbook: The Artistry and Mastery of Singing Jazz. United States, Alfred Publishing, 2005. ISBN 9780739033876
- Hughes, Fred. The Jazz Pianist: Left-hand Voicings and Chord Theory. United Kingdom, Warner Bros., 2002. ISBN 9780757993152
- Levine, Mark. The Jazz Piano Book. United States, Sher Music, 2011. ISBN 9781457101441
