= Avoid note =

Scale degree that is musically unpleasant

Avoid note is an informal term used in jazz to describe pitches that are potentially problematic in a harmony.

== Definition ==
In jazz parlance, avoid note is a term that is sometimes applied to pitches that might clash with a harmony. An F against a C major chord could be considered an avoid note because it lies a semitone above the third, an interval which was historically heard as dissonance. Treating the F as a passing tone is a simpler way to use it in a melody over a C major chord.

Jazz chords can be voiced in so many different and complex ways, that nearly any note can be incorporated into a harmony. When the C major triad is extended by thirds into a second octave, the F reappears as the 11th of the chord. 11ths are common chord extensions in jazz. They are often raised by a semitone to create a mellower major 9th against the third of a major chord.

The sixth scale degree in the Dorian mode might be considered an avoid tone because it can imply a dominant chord.

== See also ==
- Eleventh chord
- Thirteenth chord
- Tritone
- Chord-scale system
