= CSUS =

CSUS may refer to:

- Notation used for a suspended chord
- CSU Sibiu, a Transylvanian basketball team
- California State University System, a system of universities in California
  - California State University, Sacramento a university within that system, located in Sacramento
  - California State University, Stanislaus a university within that system, located in Turlock, California, in Stanislaus County
