= Thirteenth (interval) =

In music, a thirteenth can refer to either an interval or a chord.

== Interval ==
major thirteenth
- Inverse: minor third

Name
- Other names: compound sixth
- Abbreviation: M13

Size
- Semitones: 21
- Interval class: 3

Cents
- 12-Tone equal temperament: 2100.0

minor thirteenth
- Inverse: major third

Name
- Abbreviation: m13

Size
- Semitones: 20
- Interval class: 4

Cents
- 12-Tone equal temperament: 2000.0

A thirteenth interval is between two notes that are thirteen scale degrees from the root of a chord and also the interval between the root and the thirteenth. The thirteenth is most commonly major or minor. For instance, the interval between C_{4} and A_{5} (in scientific pitch notation) is a major thirteenth, while the interval between C_{4} and A♭_{5} is a minor thirteenth.

== Chord ==
Dominant thirteenth extended chord: C E G B♭ D F A. The upper structure or extensions, i.e. notes beyond the seventh, in red.

A thirteenth chord is the stacking of six (major or minor) thirds, the last being above the 11th of an eleventh chord. Thus a thirteenth chord is a tertian (built from thirds) chord containing the interval of a thirteenth, and is an extended chord if it includes the ninth and/or the eleventh. "The jazzy thirteenth is a very versatile chord and is used in many genres." Since 13th chords tend to become unclear or confused with other chords when inverted, they are generally found in root position. For example, depending on voicing, a major triad with an added major sixth is usually called a sixth chord, because the sixth serves as a substitution for the major seventh, thus considered a chord tone in such context.

However, Walter Piston, writing in 1952, considered that, "a true thirteenth chord, arrived at by superposition of thirds, is a rare phenomenon even in 20th-century music." This may be due to four-part writing, instrument limitations, and voice leading and stylistic considerations. For example, "to make the chord more playable [on guitar], thirteenth chords often omit the fifth and the ninth."

=== Dominant thirteenth chord ===
Dominant thirteenth chord in four-part writing

Most commonly, 13th chords serve a dominant function (V^{13}), whether they have the exact intervals of a dominant thirteenth or not. Typically, a dominant chord anticipating a major resolution will feature a natural 13, while a dominant chord anticipating a minor resolution will feature a flat 13. Since thirteenth chords contain more than four notes, in four-voice writing the root, third, seventh, and thirteenth are most often included, excluding the fifth, ninth, and eleventh. The third indicates the quality of the chord as major or minor, the seventh is important for the quality as a dominant chord, while the thirteenth is necessary in a thirteenth chord.

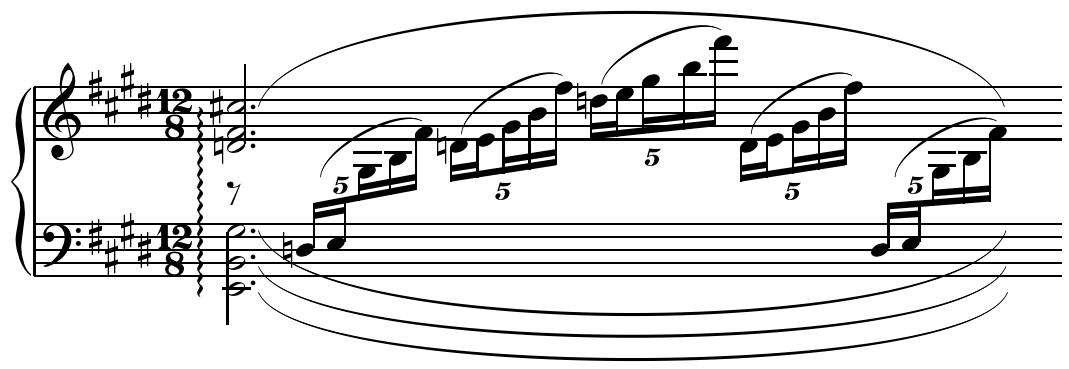
Dominant thirteenth chord in Claude Debussy's Prélude à l'après-midi d'un faune (1894)

In modern pop and jazz harmony, after the dominant thirteenth, a thirteenth chord (usually notated as X^{13}, e.g. C^{13}) contains an implied flatted seventh interval. Thus, a C^{13} consists of C, E, G, B♭, and A. The underlying harmony during a thirteenth chord is usually Mixolydian or Lydian dominant (see chord-scale system). A thirteenth chord does not imply the quality of the ninth or eleventh scale degrees. In general, what gives a thirteenth chord its characteristic sound is the dissonance between the flat seventh and the thirteenth, an interval of a major seventh.

Voice leading for dominant thirteenth chords in the common practice period.

In the common practice period the "most common" pitches present in V^{13} chord are the root, 3rd, 7th, and 13th; with the 5th, 9th, and 11th "typically omitted". The 13th is most often in the soprano, or highest voice, and usually resolves down by a 3rd to the tonic I or i. If the V^{13} is followed by a I^{9} the 13th may resolve to the 9th.

=== Other thirteenth chords ===
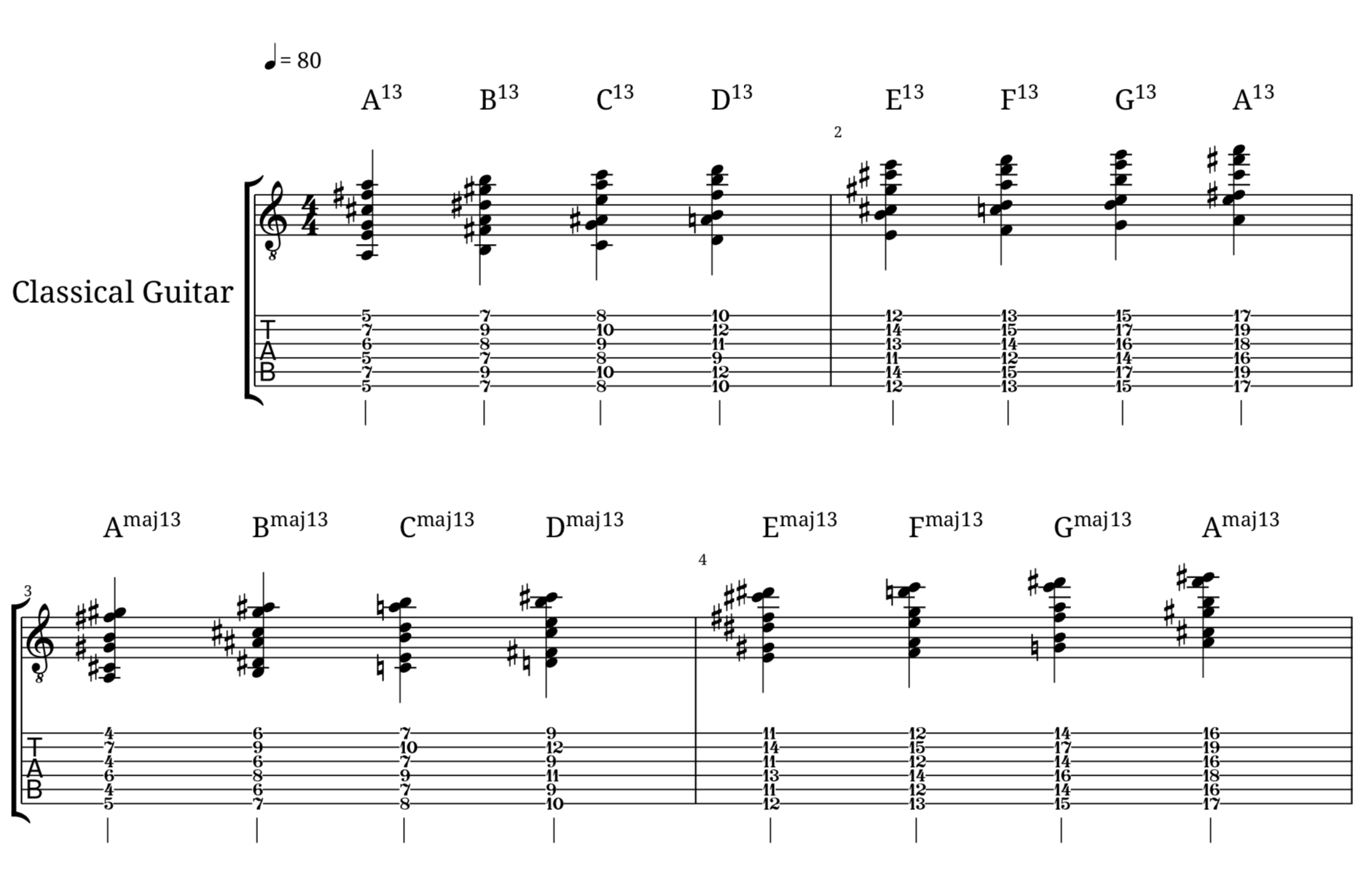
Thirteenth chords and major thirteenth chords with sheet music.

These voice leading guidelines may not be followed after the common practice period in techniques such as parallel harmony and in the following example:

Alternating (♮)13 and ♭13 chords in the "railroad sonority" from mm.1–4 of All Points West (1937) by Rodgers & Hart.

13th chords may less often be built on degrees other than the dominant, such as the tonic or subdominant.

Lennie Tristano's ending to "I Found a New Baby" (recorded 1946) is a "tonic thirteenth chord" in lydian.

While the dominant thirteenth is the most common thirteenth chord, the major thirteenth is also fairly common. A major thirteenth chord (containing a major seventh) will nearly always feature a chromatically raised eleventh (C E G B D F♯ A) (see Lydian mode), except for cases when the eleventh is omitted altogether. "It is customary to omit the eleventh on dominant or major thirteenth chords because the eleventh conflicts with the third," in these chords by a semitone.

The cadence in measures 5–8 of "Noreen's Nocturne" by Oscar Peterson (transcribed by Brent Edstrom) features 13th chords and also reveals the distinction between the compound and simple intervals of a 13th and an added 6th, respectively.

=== Inversions ===
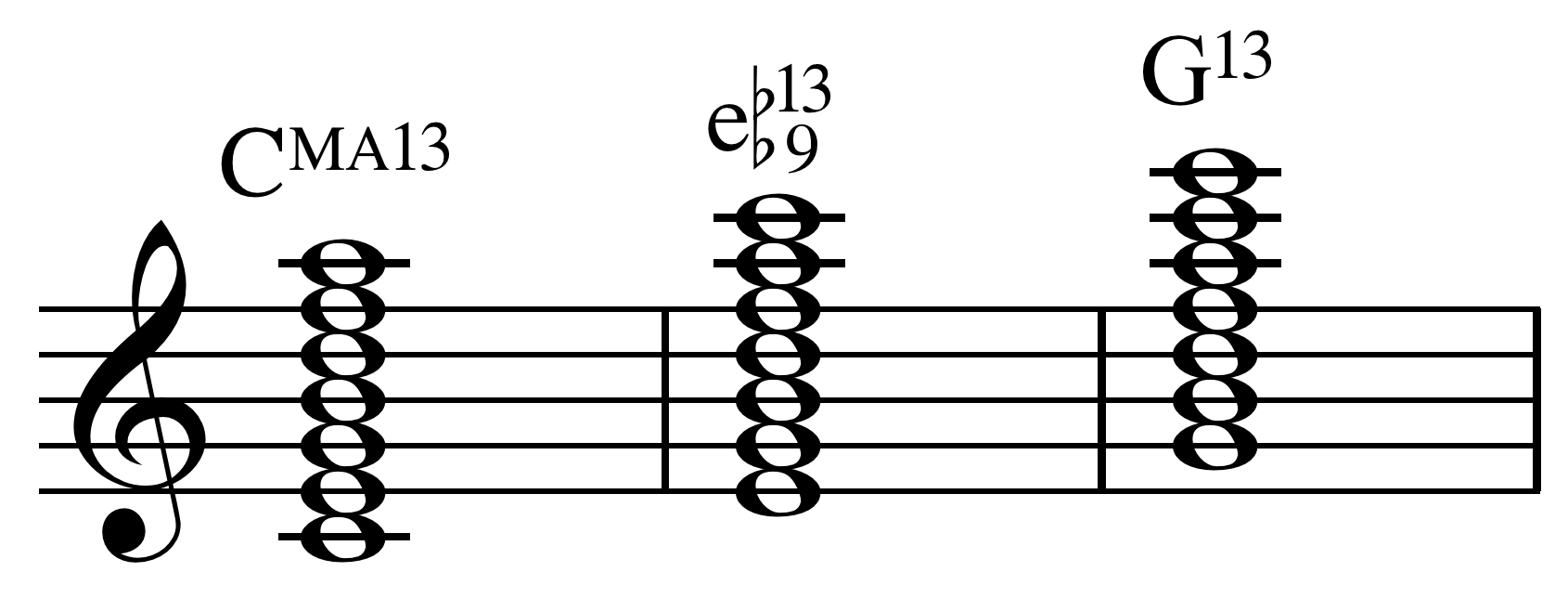
CM^{13}, first inversion = Em^{11♭9♭13}, 2nd inversion = G^{13}.... Eventually seven chords along a ladder of thirds.

Generally found in root position, the inversion of a complete thirteenth chord including all seven notes, itself, "a rare phenomenon", is a theoretical impossibility since a new thirteenth chord with a different root is produced, for example Cmaj^{13} (C–E–G–B–D–F–A) becomes Em^{11♭9♭13} (E–G–B–D–F–A–C) then G^{13} (G–B–D–F–A–C–E), and so on, when inverted.

== Gallery ==
Given the number of notes that may be included, there are a great variety of thirteenth chords. The following chords are notated below lead sheet symbols:

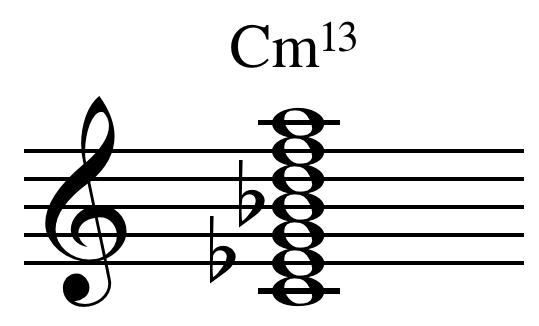
Thirteenth chord based on minor triad

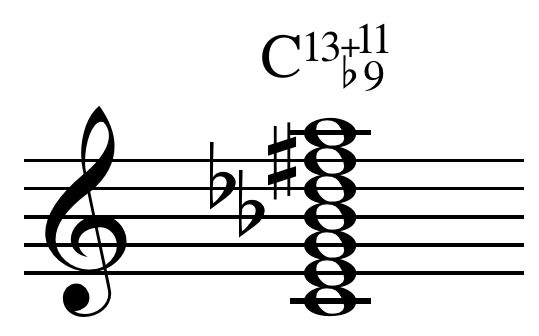
Thirteenth chord with flat ninth

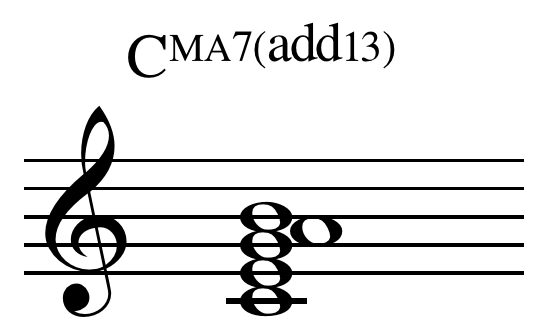

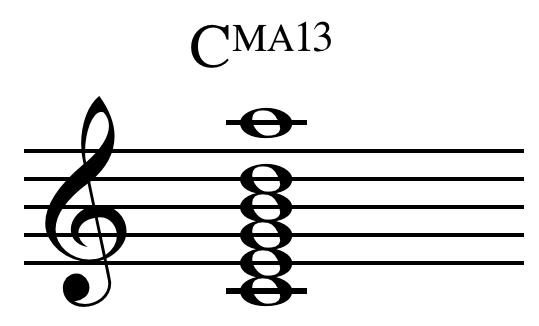

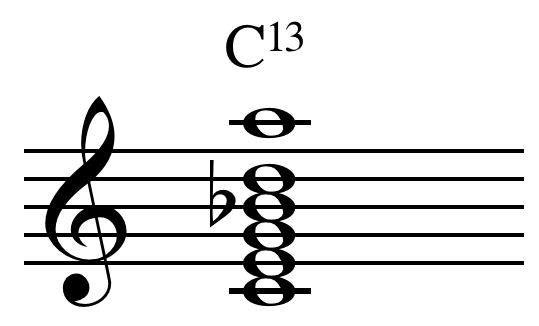

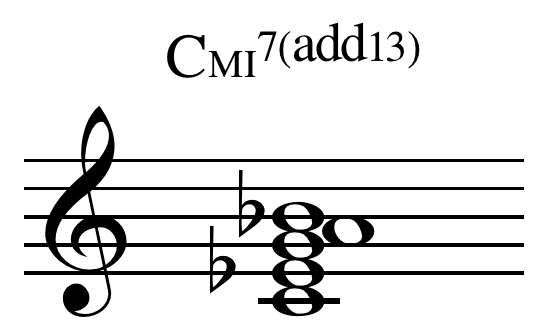

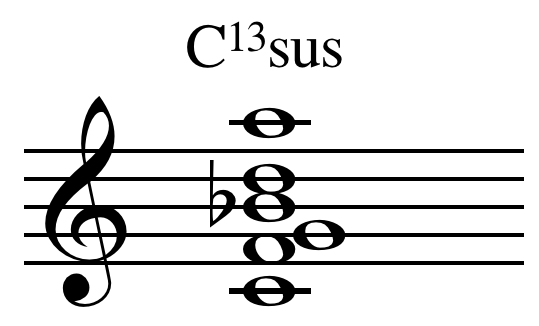

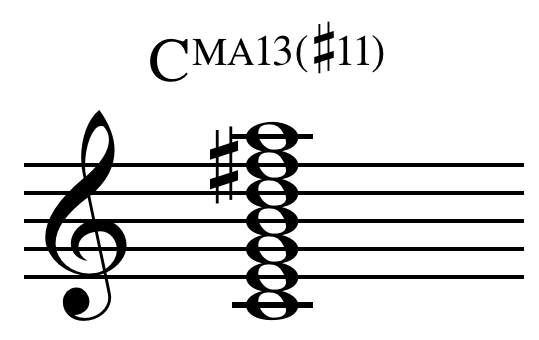

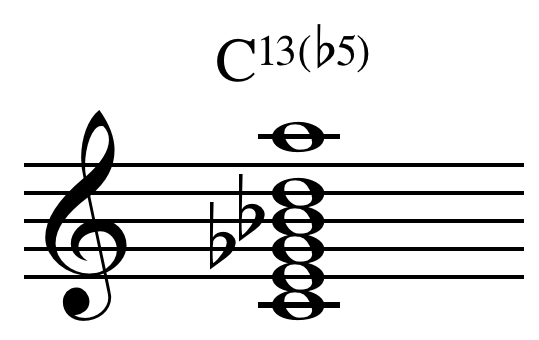

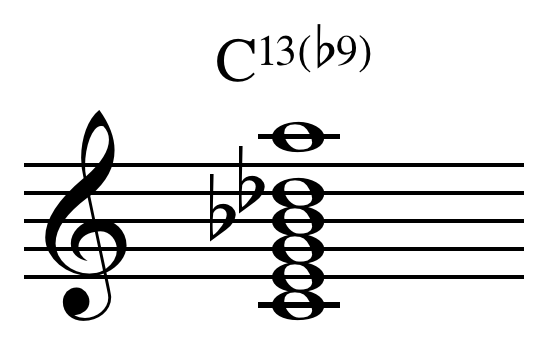

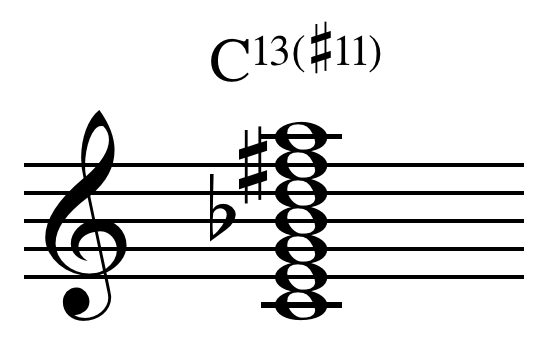

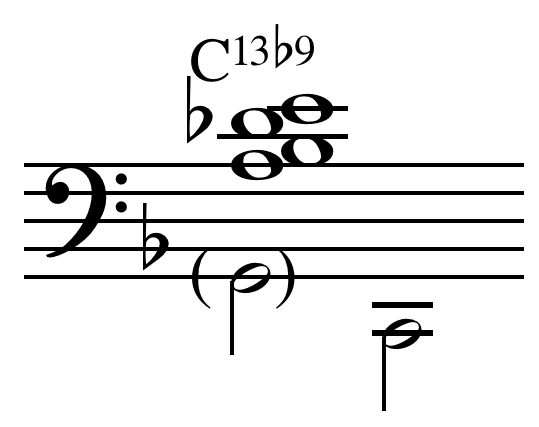
Bass note: C or alternatively G.

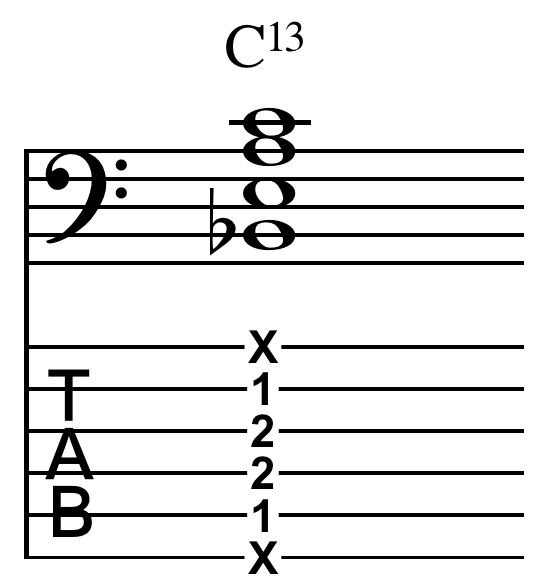
"Thirteenth chord inversion with no fifth or ninth and the flatted seventh in the bass."

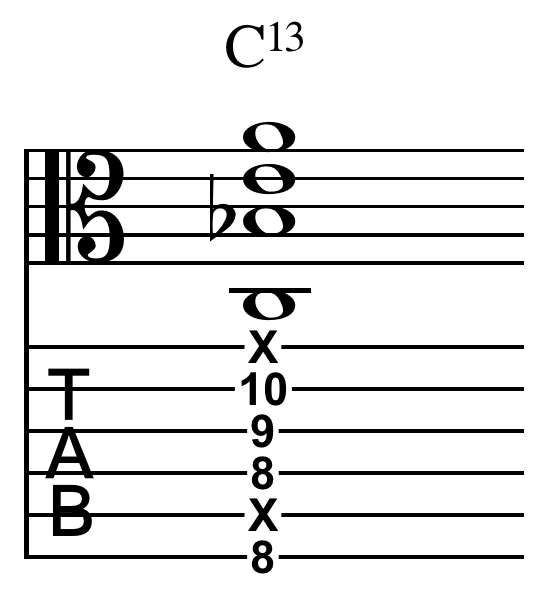
Different voicing for guitar.

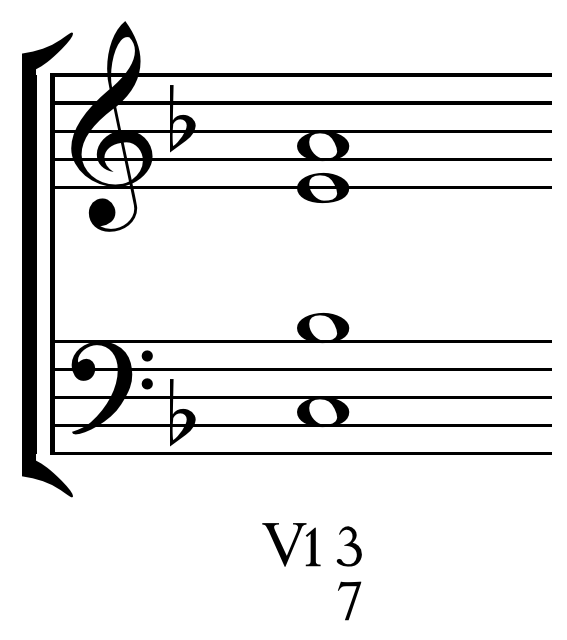
Dominant thirteenth: four-voice version. "This disposition is typical."

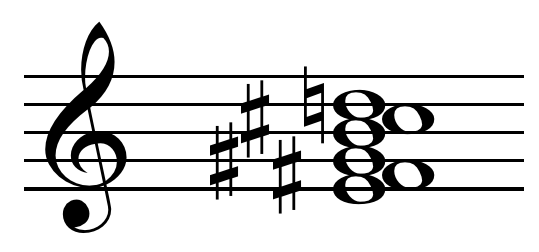
A thirteenth chord "collapsed" into one octave results in a dissonant, seemingly secundal tone cluster.

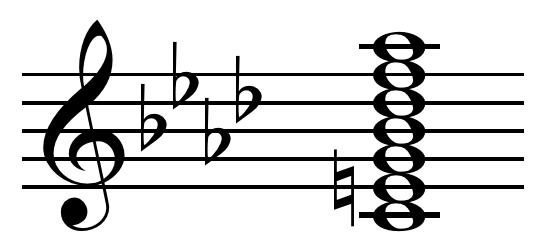
A dominant thirteenth in F minor.

== See also ==
- Jazz chord
- Harmonic planing
- Ladder of thirds
- Mystic chord

== Bibliography ==
- Benward, Bruce; Saker, Marilyn (2009). Music in Theory and Practice. Vol. II (Eight ed.). New York: McGraw-Hill. ISBN 978-0-07-310188-0.
- Capone, Phil (2006). Guitar Chord Bible: Over 500 Illustrated Chords for Rock, Blues, Soul, Country, Jazz, and Classical. ISBN 0-7858-2083-3.
- Cooper, Paul (1981). Perspectives in Music Theory: An Historical-Analytical Approach (Second ed.). New York: Harper & Row. ISBN 0-06-041373-5.
