= Five flats =

Five flats may refer to:

- D-flat major, a major musical key with five flats
- B-flat minor, a minor musical key with five flats

== See also ==
- Flat five (disambiguation)
