= Flat five =

Flat five, the lowered fifth scale degree or chord factor fifth, may refer to:

- Tritone
- Locrian mode
- Dominant seventh flat five chord
- Altered chord
