= Chord (music) =

Harmonic grouping of notes

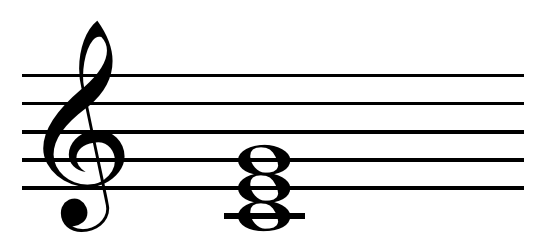
A C major chord.

A chord is the simultaneous sound of two or more musical notes. The most common chord has three notes and is known as a triad. Added tone chords, extended chords, and tone clusters can have more than three notes and are common in contemporary classical music and jazz.

An arpeggio is a chord where notes are sounded separately. A series of chords is sometimes called a chord progression. There are several ways to notate chords including figured bass, Roman numerals, the Nashville Number System, and alphabetical chord notation.

== Definition ==
The "Promenade" in Modeste Mussorgsky's Pictures at an Exhibition demonstrates a simple homophonic texture.

A chord is the sound of two or more notes being played at the same time. The term derives from "accord", which became "cord" in Middle English. The original meaning was an agreement or harmonious sound. In the 17th century, the spelling was changed to "chord" to prevent confusion with "cord".

Until the Middle Ages, harmony was any combination of two notes. In the Renaissance, the simultaneous sound of three notes began to be understood as the working definition of harmony. An arpeggio is a broken chord where each note is sounded successively instead of simultaneously. Chords can also be implied by melodies.

A chord progression is a collection of harmonies with a specific destination or purpose, such as reinforcing the tonic or modulation to a new pitch center. Chord progressions are common in Western music. Homophonic textures where the melody and harmony generally move in unison are considered the standard practice in classical music and remain central to music instruction. The study of harmony involves chords and progressions and the principles of connection that govern them.

== History ==
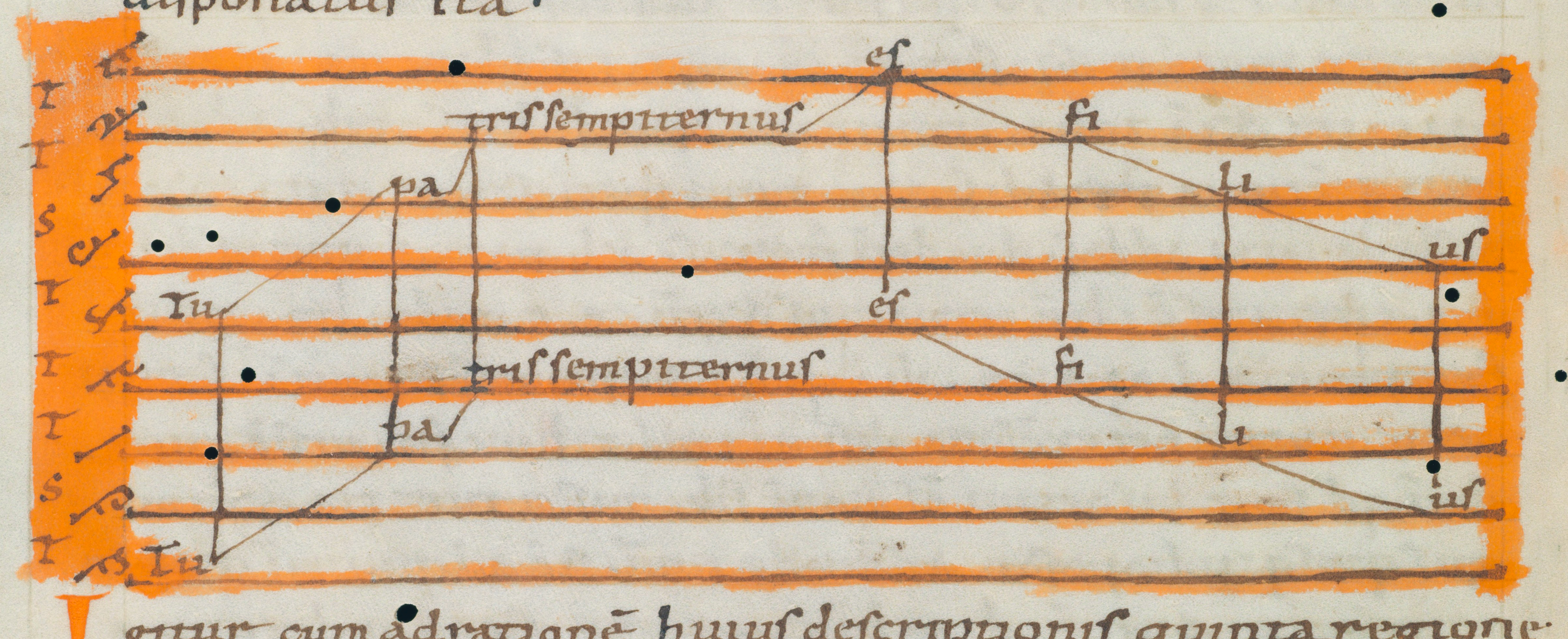
A 9th century example of polyphony in parallel fifths from Musica enchiriadis: Tu patris sempiternus es filius written in Daseian notation.

Between the 16th and 18th centuries, chords developed into primary musical elements that were distinct from their polyphonic origins. In early church polyphony known as organum, a plainsong was paired with another melody. This two-part counterpoint developed gradually into ever more complex polyphonic writing.

In organum's simplest form, the plainchant was doubled in a perfect interval like the fourth, fifth, or octave. Chords were incidental results of the melodic lines.

During the Renaissance, polyphony became more complex. Seventh chords started to appear in the 16th century. In the Baroque era, seventh chords started to function in specific ways that enabled smooth voice leading and complex cadences. The dominant seventh chord in particular became a fixture of classical music during the common practice period.

For Baroque composers, counterpoint was no longer imperative, and melodies were often accompanied simply by chords. The era also saw the rise of a shorthand notation known as figured or thorough bass. The bass melody is accompanied by numbers which indicate the harmony that should be played above each note.

As tonality expanded, structures like Neapolitan and augmented sixth chords used chromatic notes outside of the diatonic scale. Such altered chords complicated voice leading and led to more eclectic cadences and modulations. Composers began to strip the function from such chords and embrace them purely for their sonic qualities. 20th century music greatly expanded chords, adding tones and often dissonance. Jazz has a particularly eclectic chord vocabulary.

== Structure ==
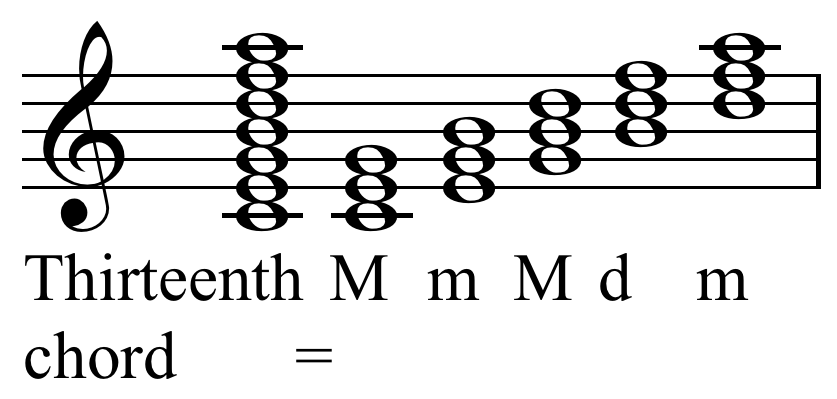
The C major thirteenth chord can be seen as a polychord combination of several different chords.

The major chord occurs in harmonics 4, 5, and 6 of the harmonic series. Adding harmonic 7 creates a seventh chord. A common triad has three notes: the root, third, and fifth. The intervals are identified by their distance from the root of the chord. The notes that form a chord are sometimes called members or factors.

Continuing up in thirds yields a seventh, ninth, eleventh, and thirteenth before returning to the root again. Complex sonorities larger than a tetrad are sometimes called polychords because they can be seen as combinations of two different chords. Extended chords are one of the central characteristics of jazz harmony.

Chords are identified by their intervals. The four basic triad qualities are major, minor, diminished, and augmented. Major and minor chords derive from the quality of their thirds. Diminished and augmented chords describe the quality of the fifth. Additional intervals like sevenths are also described by their quality in relation to the root.

Composers began expanding tonality beyond the common practice and often structured chords in fourths and fifths. They were more tonally ambiguous, enabling new patterns for music. Chords also shrunk to tone clusters made of small intervals like seconds. The resulting sound mass was a common feature in the 20th century. Microtonal chords are also used by many contemporary composers.

A seventh chord in root position, first, second, and third inversion.

Theorists began to analyze the structure of chords in the 16th century. Jean-Philippe Rameau developed the nomenclature for chord inversion that is still in use today.

Root position is when the lowest note of a chord is the root, regardless of how the other members are arranged above it. The chord is considered inverted when the root is not the lowest voice. When the third is the lowest sounding pitch, the chord is in first inversion. The second inversion puts the fifth in the bass and was widely seen as dissonant, even as composers put it into frequent practice.

== Function ==
Roman Numerals and Scale Degrees for Major Keys
| Roman Numeral | Scale Degree |
|---|---|
| I | tonic |
| II | supertonic |
| III | mediant |
| IV | subdominant |
| V | dominant |
| VI | submediant |
| VII | subtonic |
| vii | leading tone |

The names for each scale degree were bestowed on the triads above them. The dominant fifth scale degree is the root of the dominant fifth chord. Chords retained similar relationships to the tonic as their scalar forbearers. The dominant functioned as a counterweight to the tonic. A simple progression away from the tonic to the dominant and back again is the template for countless short pieces.

Hugo Riemann built on Rameau's work to develop an idea of functional harmony where every chord was analyzed by its relationship to the tonic or dominant. His work was widely adapted by other theorists.

Chords inherited their behavior from the part writing traditions of polyphony. The inner voices of chords reflected the same relationships as their melodic counterparts. The dissonance of the tritone in a dominant seventh chord is resolved stepwise in traditional part writing, with the seventh stepping down to the third and the leading tone stepping up to the tonic.

As music became more chromatic, composers broadened the vocabulary of chords. Chords were often borrowed from other keys without modulation. Altered chords obscured the root relationships in music to the point where tonality could be asserted simply by a composer's emphasis.

Chords can be spelled and analyzed in a dizzying number of ways. What remains most essential is how they sound. In the 18th century, Roman numerals were used to label chords, and the practice is still in use. In the 20th century, this approach evolved into a shorthand known as the Nashville Number System. Music theorists also simply label chords by the letter of their roots, accompanied by symbols to indicate quality and added tones. This practice is also common in popular music.

== See also ==
- List of chords

Chord types

- Added tone chord
- Altered chord
- Augmented triad
- Borrowed chord
- Diminished triad
- Dominant seventh flat five chord
- Extended chord

Ninth chord
Eleventh chord
thirteenth

- Seventh chord

Augmented seventh chord
Diminished seventh chord
Dominant seventh chord
Dominant seventh sharp ninth chord
Half-diminished seventh chord
Minor seventh chord
Minor major seventh chord
Major seventh chord
Augmented major seventh chord

- Suspended chord

Chord notation and analysis

- Chord chart
- Chord notation
- Figured bass
- Nashville Number System
- Roman numeral analysis
