= Augmented octave =

- Inverse: see "Augmented unison"

Name
- Other names: Augmented eighth
- Abbreviation: A8

Size
- Semitones: 13
- Interval class: 1
- Just interval: 25:12

Cents
- 12-Tone equal temperament: 1300
- Just intonation: 1271

In Western tonal music theory, an augmented octave is the sum of a perfect octave and an augmented unison or chromatic semitone. It is the interval between two notes, with the same note letter on staff positions an octave apart, whose alterations cause them, in ordinary equal temperament, to be thirteen semitones apart. In other words, it is a perfect octave which has been widened by a half-step, such as B♭ and B♮ or C and C♯; it is a compound augmented unison.

It is the enharmonic equivalent of a minor ninth.

== See also ==
- False relation
- List of musical intervals
- List of pitch intervals
- Ninth (interval) § Minor ninth
