= Chord-scale system =

Method of pairing compatible chords and scales

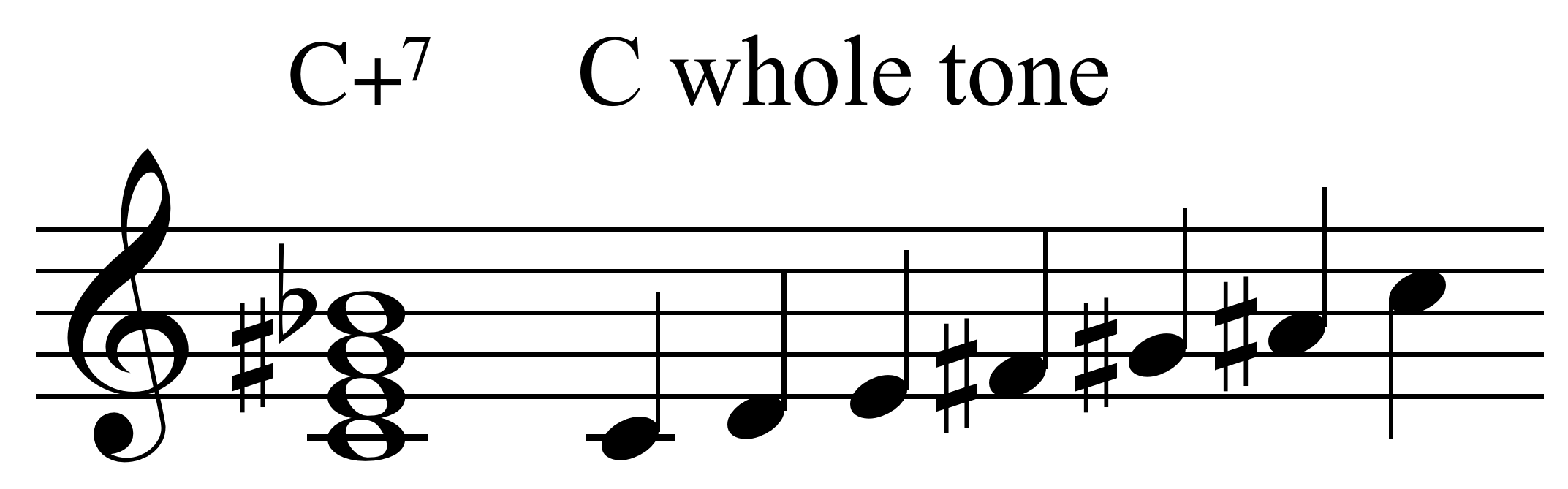
One chord scale option for a C augmented dominant seventh chord (C E G♯ B♭) is the C whole tone scale: C D E F♯ G♯ A♯/B♭

The chord-scale system is a method of matching, from a list of possible chords, a list of possible scales. The system has been widely used since the 1970s.

However, the majority of older players used the chord tone/chord arpeggio method. The system is an example of the difference between the treatment of dissonance in jazz and classical harmony: "Classical treats all notes that don't belong to the chord ... as potential dissonances to be resolved. ... Non-classical harmony just tells you which note in the scale to [potentially] avoid ... meaning that all the others are okay".

The chord-scale system may be compared with other common methods of improvisation, first, the older traditional chord tone/chord arpeggio method, and where one scale on one root note is used throughout all chords in a progression (for example the blues scale on A for all chords of the blues progression: A^{7} E^{7} D^{7}). In contrast, in the chord-scale system, a different scale is used for each chord in the progression (for example mixolydian scales on A, E, and D for chords A^{7}, E^{7}, and D^{7}, respectively). Improvisation approaches may be mixed, such as using "the blues approach" for a section of a progression and using the chord-scale system for the rest.

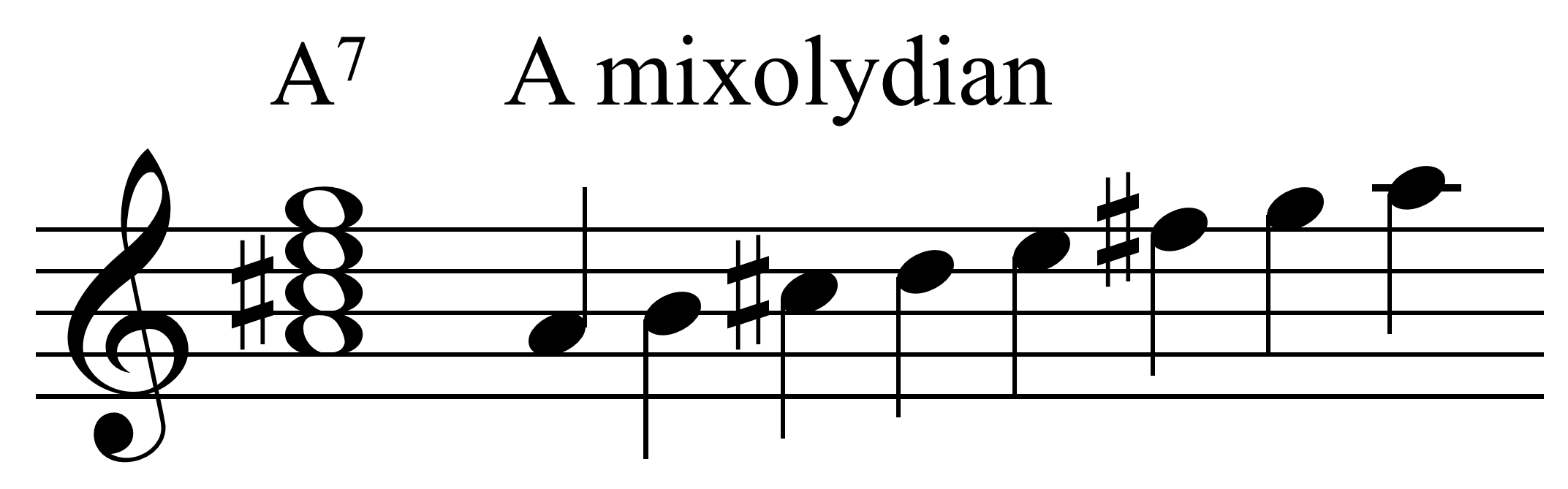
Dominant seventh chord normally paired with mixolydian scale, the fifth mode of the major scale.

The scales commonly used today consist of the seven modes of the diatonic scale, the seven modes of the melodic minor scale, the diminished scales, the whole-tone scale, and pentatonic and bebop scales. In the example below featuring C^{7♯11} and C lydian dominant every note of the scale may be considered a chord tone while in the example above featuring A^{7} and A mixolydian the scale is thought of as a 'filling in' of the steps that are missing between members of the chord. Students now typically learn as many as twenty-one scales, which may be compared with the four scales commonly used in jazz in the 1940s (major, minor, mixolydian, and blues) and the two later added by bebop (diminished and whole-tone) to the tonal resources of jazz.

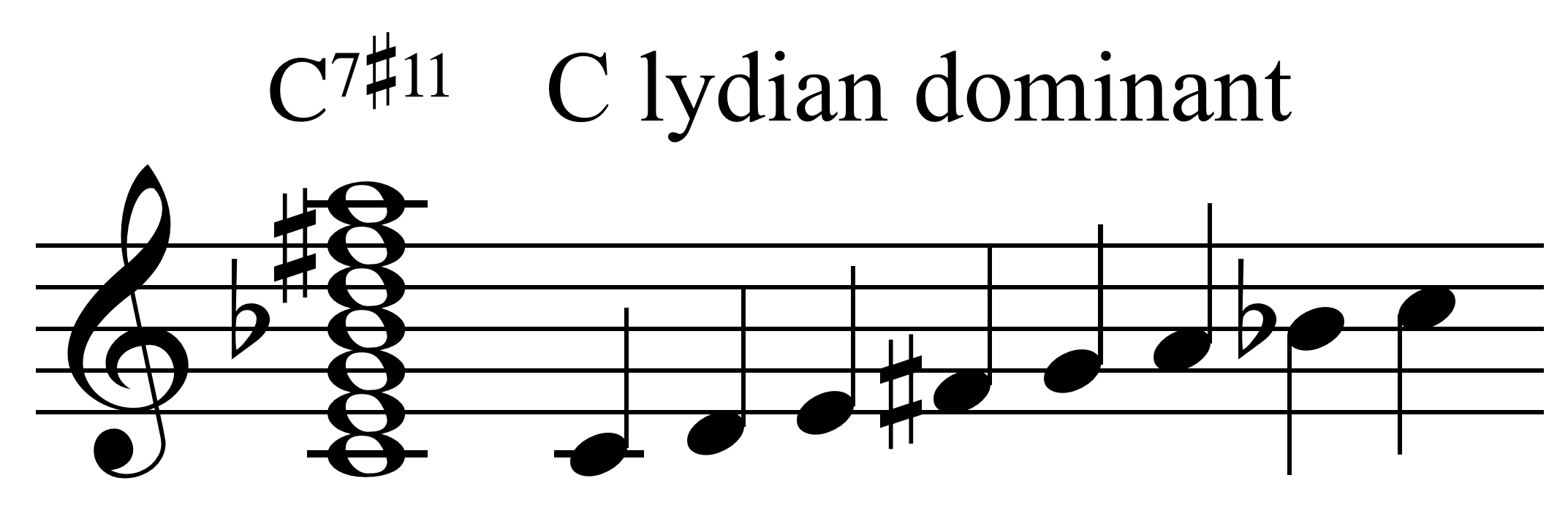
The corresponding scale for the C^{7♯11} chord, with added ninth and thirteenth tensions, is C lydian dominant, the fourth mode of the ascending melodic minor.

Originating with George Russell's Lydian Chromatic Concept of Tonal Organization (1953), the chord-scale system is now the "most widely used method for teaching jazz improvisation in college". This approach is found in instructional books including Jerry Bergonzi's Inside Improvisation series and characterized by the highly influential Play-A-Long series by Jamey Aebersold. Aebersold's materials, and their orientation to learning by applying theory over backing tracks, also provided the first known publication of the blues scale in the 1970 revision of Volume 1 There are differences of approach within the system. For example, Russell associated the C major chord with the lydian scale, while teachers including John Mehegan, David Baker, and Mark Levine teach the major scale as the best match for a C major chord.

Miles Davis's Lydian Chromatic Concept-influenced first modal jazz album Kind of Blue, is often given as an example of chord-scale relationships in practice.

The chord-scale system provides familiarity with typical chord progressions, technical facility from practicing scales and chord arpeggios, and generally succeeds in reducing "clams", or notes heard as mistakes (through providing note-choice possibilities for the chords of progressions), and building "chops", or virtuosity. Disadvantages include the exclusion of non-chord tones characteristic of bop and free styles, the "in-between" sounds featured in the blues, and consideration of directionality created between the interaction of a solo and a chord progression: "The disadvantages of this system may become clear when students begin to question why their own playing does not sound like such outstanding linear-oriented players as Charlie Parker, Sonny Stitt or Johnny Griffin (or, for that matter, the freer jazz stylists)":

The chord-scale method's 'vertical' approach ... is 'static,' offering little assistance in generating musical direction through the movement of chords. Hence the importance of knowing the older chord tone approach. But ... Swing- and bop-era songforms operate teleologically with regard to harmony. Highly regarded soloists in those styles typically imply the movements of chords ... either by creating lines that voice-lead smoothly from one chord to another or by confounding the harmony pull through anticipating or delaying harmonic resolution.

Essential considerations of a style such as Charlie Parker's, including "rhythm, phrase shape and length, dynamics, and tone color," as well as "passing tones, appoggiatura, and 'blue notes'" are unaddressed. This appears to have led educators to emphasize a specific repertoire of pieces most appropriate to the chord-scale system, such as John Coltrane's "Giant Steps", while excluding others, such as Coltrane's later styles of composition, and producing generations of "pattern" players among college-educated musicians.

== See also ==
- Jazz chord
- Jazz scale
- Side-slipping
