= Augmented seventh chord =

Musical chord

augmented seventh chord
Component intervals from root
- minor seventh
- augmented fifth
- major third
- root

Tuning
- 80:100:125:144

Forte no. / Complement
- 4-24 / 8-24

The augmented seventh chord, or seventh augmented fifth chord, or seventh sharp five chord is a seventh chord composed of a root, major third, augmented fifth, and minor seventh (1, 3, ♯5, ♭7). It can be viewed as an augmented triad with a minor seventh. When using popular-music symbols, it is denoted by +^{7}, aug^{7}, or ^{7♯5}. For example, the augmented seventh chord built on A♭, written as A♭+^{7}, has pitches A♭–C–E–G♭:

The chord can be represented by the integer notation {0, 4, 8, 10}.

== Use ==
The root is the only optional note in an augmented seventh chord, the fifth being required because it is raised. This alteration is useful in the major mode because the raised 5th creates a leading tone to the 3rd of the tonic triad. See also dominant.

In rock parlance, the term augmented seventh chord is sometimes confusingly and erroneously used to refer to the so-called "Hendrix chord", a 7♯9 chord which contains the interval of an augmented ninth but not an augmented fifth.

One chord-scale option for an augmented dominant seventh chord (+7th) is the whole tone scale.

The augmented minor seventh chord may be considered an altered dominant seventh and may use the whole tone scale, as may the dominant seventh flat five chord. See chord-scale system.

The augmented seventh chord normally acts as a dominant, resolving to the chord a fifth below. Thus, G aug^{7} resolves to a C major or minor chord, for example.

Overall, however, the augmented seventh chord is infrequently used, with the raised fifth degree often being the result of a chromatic passing tone.

== Augmented seventh chord table ==
Chord	Root	Major third	Augmented fifth	Minor seventh
Caug^{7}	C	E	G♯	B♭
C♯aug^{7}	C♯	E♯ (F)	G (A)	B
D♭aug^{7}	D♭	F	A	C♭ (B)
Daug^{7}	D	F♯	A♯	C
D♯aug^{7}	D♯	F (G)	A (B)	C♯
E♭aug^{7}	E♭	G	B	D♭
Eaug^{7}	E	G♯	B♯ (C)	D
Faug^{7}	F	A	C♯	E♭
F♯aug^{7}	F♯	A♯	C (D)	E
G♭aug^{7}	G♭	B♭	D	F♭ (E)
Gaug^{7}	G	B	D♯	F
G♯aug^{7}	G♯	B♯ (C)	D (E)	F♯
A♭aug^{7}	A♭	C	E	G♭
Aaug^{7}	A	C♯	E♯ (F)	G
A♯aug^{7}	A♯	C (D)	E (F♯)	G♯
B♭aug^{7}	B♭	D	F♯	A♭
Baug^{7}	B	D♯	F (G)	A

== See also ==
- Augmentation (music)

== Bibliography ==
- Ottman, Robert W. (1992) [1961]. Advanced Harmony: Theory and Practice (4th ed.). Englewood Cliffs, NJ: Prentice Hall. ISBN 0-13-006016-X.
