= Dominant seventh flat five chord =

Type of musical chord

dominant seventh flat five chord
Component intervals from root
- minor seventh
- diminished fifth (tritone)
- major third
- root

Forte no. / Complement
- 4-25 / 8-25

In music theory, the dominant seventh flat five chord is a seventh chord composed of a root note, together with a major third, a diminished fifth, and a minor seventh above the root (1, ♮3, ♭5 and ♭7). For example, the dominant seventh flat five chord built on G, commonly written as G^{7♭5}, is composed of the pitches G–B–D♭–F:

It can be represented by the integer notation {0, 4, 6, 10}.

This chord is enharmonically equivalent to its own second inversion. That is, it has the same notes as the dominant seventh flat five chord a tritone away (although they may be spelled differently), so for instance, F♯^{7♭5} and C^{7♭5} are enharmonically equivalent. Because of this property, it readily functions as a pivot chord. It is also frequently encountered in tritone substitutions. In this sense, there are only six "unique" dominant seventh flat five chords.

In diatonic harmony, the dominant seventh flat five chord does not naturally occur on any scale degree (as does, for example, the diminished triad on the seventh scale degree of the major scale e.g. B^{o} in C major). In classical harmony, the chord is rarely seen spelled as a seventh chord and is instead most commonly found as the enharmonically equivalent French sixth chord.

In jazz harmony, the dominant seventh flat five may be considered an altered chord, created by lowering the fifth of a dominant seventh chord, and may use the whole-tone scale, as may the augmented minor seventh chord, or the Lydian ♭7 mode, as well as most of the modes of the Neapolitan major scale, such as the major Locrian scale, the leading whole-tone scale, and the Lydian minor scale.

== Dominant seventh flat five chord table ==
| Chord | Root | Major third | Diminished fifth | Minor seventh |
|---|---|---|---|---|
| C^{7♭5} | C | E | G♭ | B♭ |
| C♯^{7♭5} | C♯ | E♯ (F) | G | B |
| D♭^{7♭5} | D♭ | F | A (G) | C♭ (B) |
| D^{7♭5} | D | F♯ | A♭ | C |
| D♯^{7♭5} | D♯ | F (G) | A | C♯ |
| E♭^{7♭5} | E♭ | G | B (A) | D♭ |
| E^{7♭5} | E | G♯ | B♭ | D |
| F^{7♭5} | F | A | C♭ (B) | E♭ |
| F♯^{7♭5} | F♯ | A♯ | C | E |
| G♭^{7♭5} | G♭ | B♭ | D (C) | F♭ (E) |
| G^{7♭5} | G | B | D♭ | F |
| G♯^{7♭5} | G♯ | B♯ (C) | D | F♯ |
| A♭^{7♭5} | A♭ | C | E (D) | G♭ |
| A^{7♭5} | A | C♯ | E♭ | G |
| A♯^{7♭5} | A♯ | C (D) | E | G♯ |
| B♭^{7♭5} | B♭ | D | F♭ (E) | A♭ |
| B^{7♭5} | B | D♯ | F | A |

== Chords for guitarists ==
Dominant seventh flat five chords for a guitar in standard tuning. (left is the low E string, number is the fret, x means mute the string)

- A♭^{7♭5}: xx6778
- B^{7♭5}: x23245
- C^{7♭5}: x34356
- D^{7♭5}: xx0112
- E^{7♭5}: 010130
- F^{7♭5}: xx3445
- G^{7♭5}: xx5667

== See also ==
- Altered scale
- French sixth
- Half diminished chord
