= Fifth (chord) =

Chord in music theory

In a chord, the fifth factor is the note five scale degrees above the root (including the root itself in the count). For instance, in a C major triad, G is the third factor.

When the fifth is the bass note (i.e., the lowest note) of the triad or seventh chord, the chord is in second inversion.

Conventionally, the fifth is second in importance to the root, with the fifth being perfect in all primary triads (I, IV, V and i, iv, v). In jazz chords and theory, however, the fifth is often omitted in preference for the chord quality determining third and chord extensions and additions.

The fifth in a major and minor chord is perfect (G♮ in C). When the fifth of a major chord is raised it is an augmented chord (G♯ in C). When the fifth of a minor chord is lowered it is a diminished chord (G♭ in C).

The open fifth and power chord consists of only the root, fifth and their octave doublings.

== See also ==
- Dominant seventh flat five chord
- Hallelujah (Leonard Cohen song), which references the Fifth
