= Major seventh chord =

Type of chord in music

Component intervals from root
- major seventh
- perfect fifth
- major third
- root

Tuning
- 8:10:12:15

Forte no. / Complement
- 4–20 / 8–20

Dizzy Gillespie's 1956 recording of "Dizzy's Business" ends with a major seventh chord with root on G.

In music, a major seventh chord is a seventh chord in which the third is a major third above the root and the seventh is a major seventh above the root. The major seventh chord, sometimes also called a Delta chord, can be written as maj^{7}, M^{7}, Δ, ⑦, etc. The "7" does not have to be superscripted, but if it is, then any alterations, added tones, or omissions are usually also superscripted. For example, the major seventh chord built on C, commonly written as Cmaj^{7}, has pitches C–E–G–B:

It can be represented by the integer notation {0, 4, 7, 11}.

According to Forte, the major seventh chord is exemplified by IV^{7}, which originates melodically.

Just major seventh chord on C

The just major seventh chord is tuned in the ratios 8:10:12:15, as a just major chord is tuned 4:5:6 and a just major seventh is tuned 15:8.

The minor flat sixth chord (minor triad with an added minor sixth) is an inversion of this chord.

== Examples ==
In 1888, the French composer Erik Satie composed three slow waltzes, entitled Gymnopédies. The first and best-known of these alternates two major seventh chords. The first eight measures (shown below) alternate between Gmaj^{7} and Dmaj^{7}.

Later examples of tonic major seventh chords include Henry Mancini's Theme from Charlie's Angels, Joseph Kosma's "Autumn Leaves", The Beatles' "This Boy", Eagles' "One of These Nights", Bread's "Make It With You", America's "Tin Man", Blood Sweat & Tears' "You've Made Me So Very Happy", the third (main) part of Paul McCartney and Wings' "Band On The Run", Carly Simon's "The Right Thing to Do", and Chicago's "Colour My World".

Common in jazz since the Jazz Age of the 1920s, major seventh chords appeared frequently in compositions of genres influenced by jazz in the subsequent decades, such as traditional pop, bossa nova, and easy listening. Moving into the 1970s to replace the prominence of the dominant seventh chord as a stable tonic more common in the first fifteen years of the rock era, the major seventh was common in all styles, "pervading soul, country rock, soft rock, MOR (middle-of-the-road styles), jazz rock, funk, and disco." Music theorist Ken Stephenson continues:

In soul and disco, a tonic minor seventh harmony often alternated with a dominant seventh or dominant ninth chord on ['Lady Marmalade' & 'Le Freak']... In other styles, major seventh and minor seventh chords generally mix (usually with eleventh chords...) to create a diatonic composite in either major or minor mode.... The most famous major seventh chord in the history of music, [is] the one that opens... 'Colour My World', even though the song departs from the usual pattern described above by 'colouring' the harmonic succession with several chromatic chords. Still, seven of that song's fourteen chords, including the tonic, are major sevenths or ninths, demonstrating the primacy of that chord type.

Pieces which feature prominent major seventh chords include: Tadd Dameron's "Lady Bird", and "This Guy's in Love with You", by Burt Bacharach and Hal David.

== Major seventh chord table ==
Chord	Root	Major third	Perfect fifth	Major seventh
Cmaj^{7}	C	E	G	B
C♯maj^{7}	C♯	E♯ (F)	G♯	B♯ (C)
D♭maj^{7}	D♭	F	A♭	C
Dmaj^{7}	D	F♯	A	C♯
D♯maj^{7}	D♯	F (G)	A♯	C (D)
E♭maj^{7}	E♭	G	B♭	D
Emaj^{7}	E	G♯	B	D♯
Fmaj^{7}	F	A	C	E
F♯maj^{7}	F♯	A♯	C♯	E♯ (F)
G♭maj^{7}	G♭	B♭	D♭	F
Gmaj^{7}	G	B	D	F♯
G♯maj^{7}	G♯	B♯ (C)	D♯	F (G)
A♭maj^{7}	A♭	C	E♭	G
Amaj^{7}	A	C♯	E	G♯
A♯maj^{7}	A♯	C (D)	E♯ (F)	G (A)
B♭maj^{7}	B♭	D	F	A
Bmaj^{7}	B	D♯	F♯	A♯

== Major seventh chords for guitar ==
In standard tuning, the left is the low E string. To the right of the | is another way of playing the same chord. x means mute the string. (The Amaj^{7} demonstrates the movable chord shapes.)

- Amaj^{7}: xx7654 | xxx224 | xx7999 | x02120 | 576655
- Bmaj^{7}: x24342 | 7988xx
- Cmaj^{7}: x35453 | x32000 | x35453
- Dmaj^{7}: xx0222 | x57675
- Emaj^{7}: xx2444 | 021100
- Fmaj^{7}: xx3555 | 103210 | xx3210
- Gmaj^{7}: xx5777 | 320002

== See also ==
- Subtonic
