= Extended chord =

Musical chord extending a simple triad

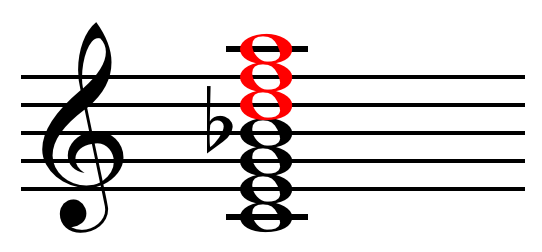
Dominant thirteenth extended chord: C–E–G–B♭–D–F–A. The upper structure or extensions, i.e. notes beyond the seventh, in red.

In music, extended chords are tertian chords with notes beyond the seventh. Chords such as the ninth, eleventh, and thirteenth chords are extended chords. The thirteenth is the furthest extension diatonically possible as, by that point, all seven tonal degrees are represented within the chord. In practice, however, extended chords do not typically use all the chord members: the fifth is often omitted, as well as the ninth and eleventh, unless they are altered to give a special texture.

Extended chords were rarely used in the Baroque era and are used more frequently in the Classical era. The Romantic era saw greatly increased use of extended harmony. Extended harmony prior to the 20th century usually has dominant function – as V^{9}, V^{11}, and V^{13}, or V^{9}/V, V^{13}/ii etc.

Examples of the extended chords used as tonic harmonies include Wild Cherry's "Play That Funky Music" (either a dominant ninth or dominant thirteenth).

== History ==
=== Classical music ===
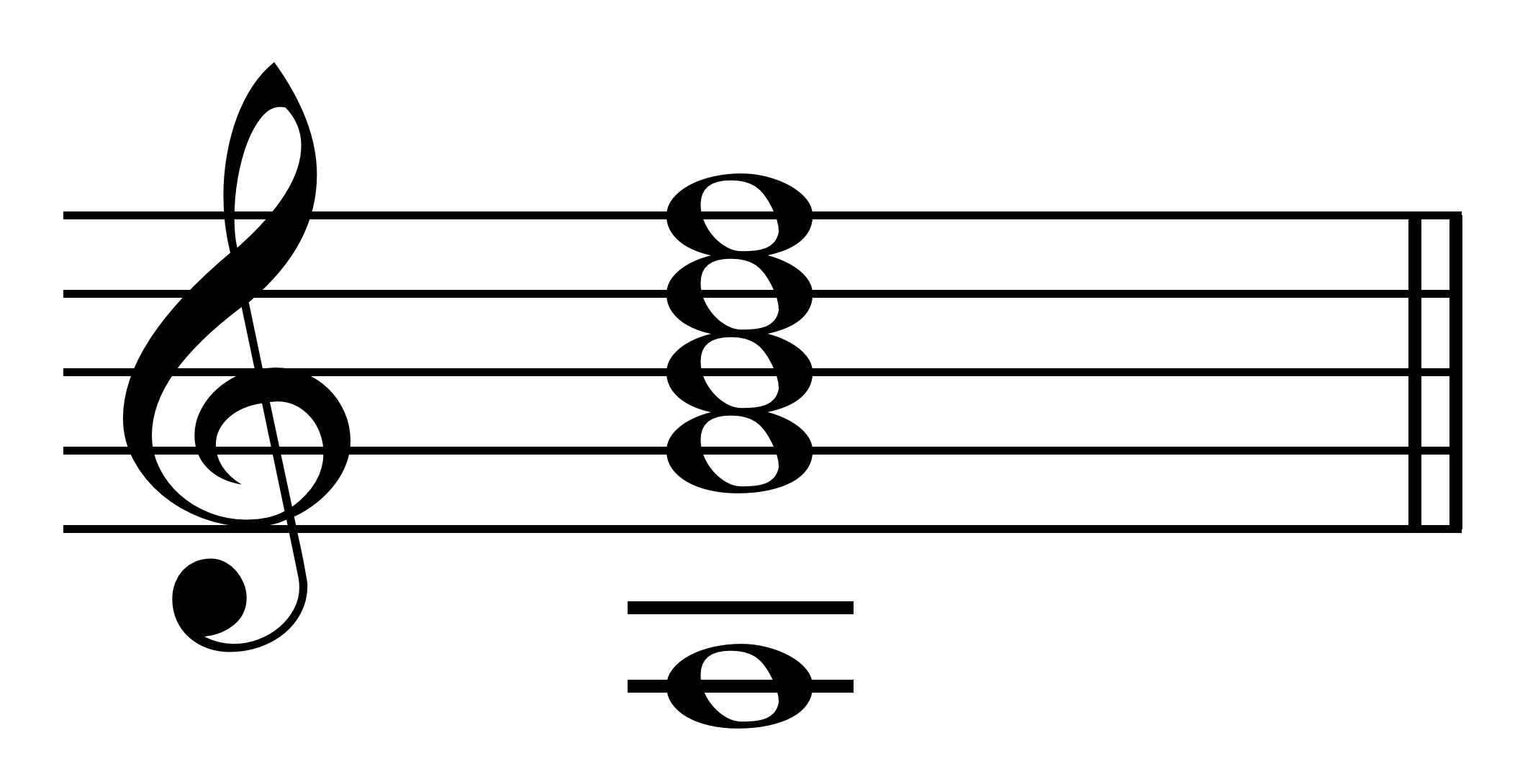
Fifteenth chord discussed by Marpurg as resulting from the addition of a ninth below a (dominant) seventh chord

In the 18th century, ninth and eleventh chords were theorized as downward extensions of seventh chords, according to theories of supposition.

In 1722, Jean-Philippe Rameau first proposed the concept that ninth and eleventh chords are built from seventh chords by (the composer) placing a "supposed" bass one or two thirds below the fundamental bass or actual root of the chord. With the theoretical chord F–A–C–E–G–B the fundamental bass would be considered C, while the supposed bass would be F. Thus the notes F and A are added below a seventh chord on C, C–E–G–B, triadically (in thirds). This is also referred to as the "H chord".

The theory of supposition was adopted and modified by Pierre-Joseph Roussier, Friedrich Wilhelm Marpurg, and other theorists. A. F. C. Kollmann, following Johann Kirnberger, adopted a simpler approach and one closer to that prevalent today, in which Rameau's "supposed" bass is considered the fundamental and the ninth and eleventh are regarded as transient notes inessential to the structure of the chord. Thus F–A–C–E–G–B is considered a seventh chord on F, F–A–C–E, with G and B being nonchord tones added above triadically.

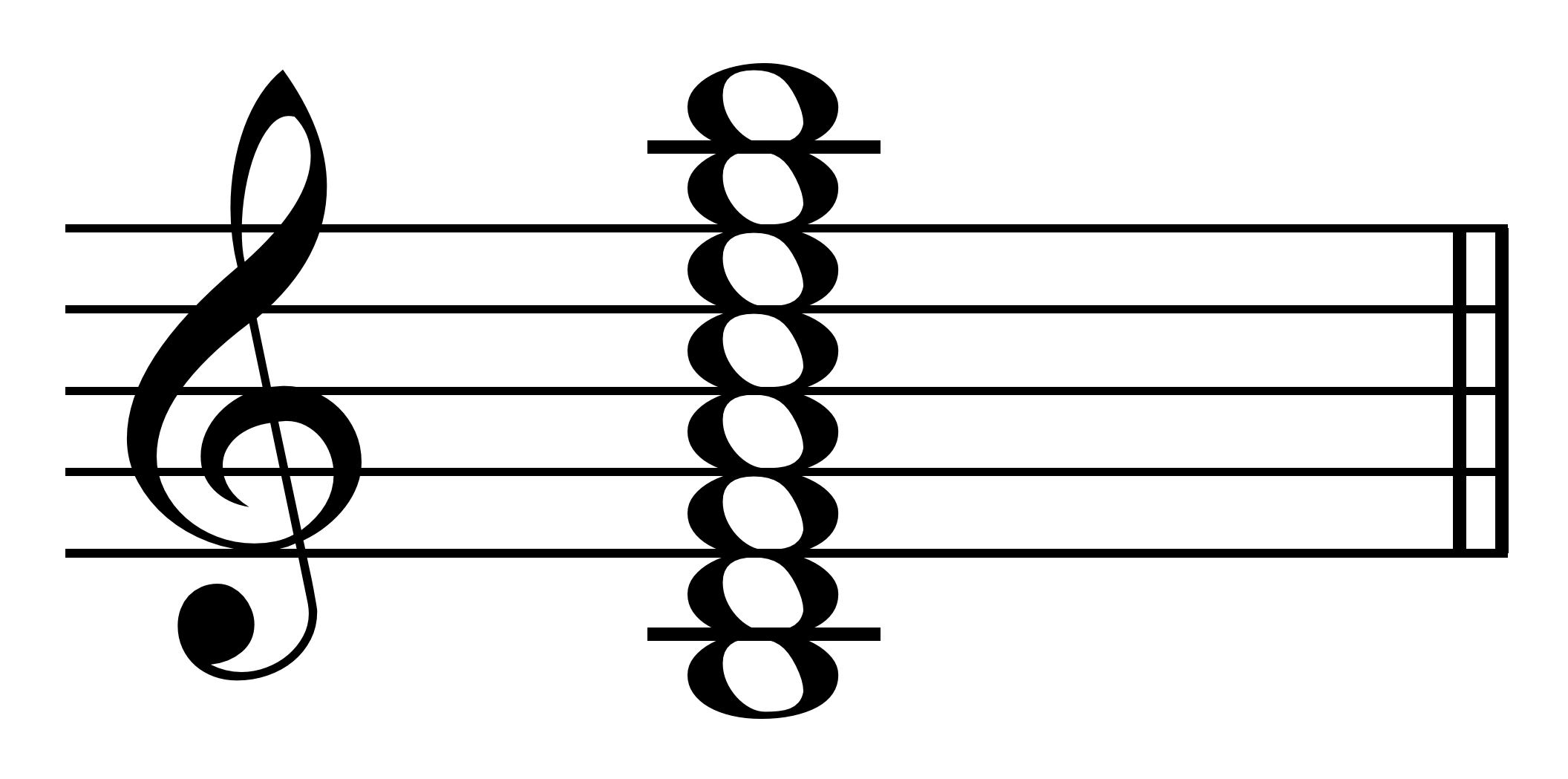
Diatonic fifteenth chord on B that opens Franz Liszt's Ossa arida (1879), in, "a striking anticipation of twentieth-century harmonic experimentation".

In 19th century, the seventh chord was generally the upper limit in "chordal consonance", with ninth and eleventh chords being used for "extra power" but invariably with one or more notes treated as appoggiaturas. The thickness of complete ninth, eleventh or thirteenth chords in close position was also generally avoided through leaving out one or more tones or using wider spacing (open position).

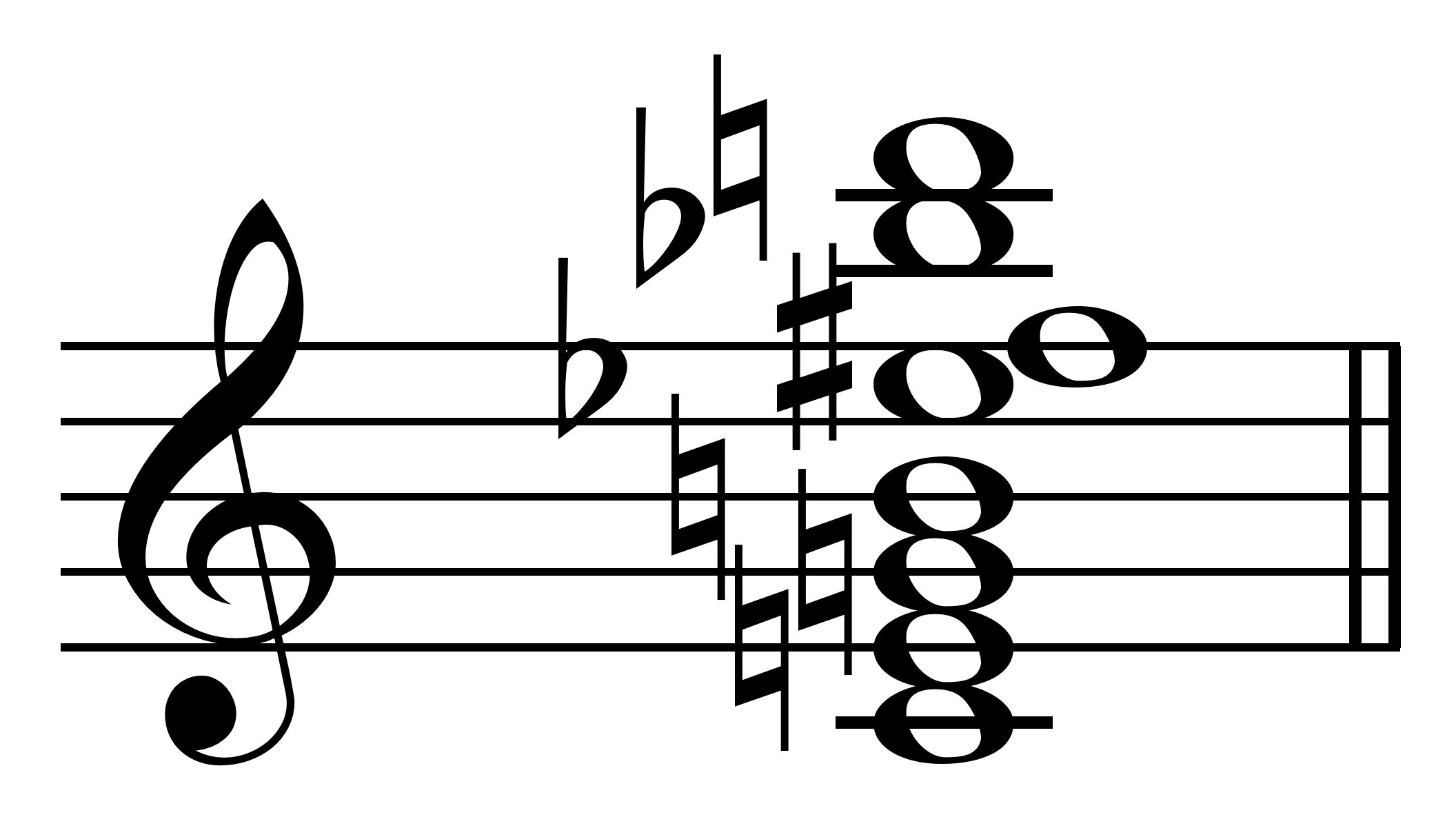
Final chord of Arnold Schoenberg's Sechs kleine Klavierstücke, 2nd movement, in thirds: C–E–G–B–D♯–F♯–A♯–C.

In the 20th century, especially in jazz and popular music, ninth chords were used as elaborations of simpler chords, particularly as substitutes for the tonic triad at the end of a piece. The "piling up" of thirds above the tonic to make seventh, ninth, eleventh, or even thirteenth chords "is one of the most important characteristics of jazz harmony". Vítězslav Novák's student Jaroslav Novotný (1886–1918) used a fifteenth chord in the fourth song of his 1909 song cycle Eternal Marriage.

=== Jazz and funk ===
Jazz from the 1930s onward, jazz fusion from the 1970s onward and funk all have been seen to use extended chords as a key part of their sound. In these genres, chords often include added ninths, elevenths and thirteenths as well as their altered variations. In jazz and jazz fusion, compositions consist of complex chord progressions in which many of the chords are extended chords and in which many of the dominant seventh chords are altered extended chords (e.g., A^{7add9♯11} or D^{7♭9♯11}).

Funk also uses altered extended chords, but in this genre, pieces are usually based on a vamp on a single chord, because rhythm and groove are the key elements of the style. When extended chords are voiced in jazz or jazz fusion, the root and fifth are often omitted from the chord voicing, because the root is played by the bass player.

== Chord structure ==
Building on each of the major scale degrees the thirteenth chord chord quality that is harmonic to such scale (i.e. with all its notes belonging to such scale), results in the following table. The numbering is relative to the scale degree numbers of the major scale that has the major scale degree in question as tonic:

Chord root	Chord quality	1	3	5	7	9	11	13
I	Im^{maj13♯5}	♮	♭	♯	♮	♮	♮	♮
ii	iim^{maj13}	♮	♭	♮	♮	♮	♮	♮
iii	iiim^{7♭9♯11♭13}	♮	♭	♮	♭	♭	♯	♭
IV	IVM^{13♯11}	♮	♮	♮	♮	♮	♯	♮
V	Vm^{13}	♮	♭	♮	♭	♮	♮	♮
vi	vim^{7♭13}	♮	♭	♮	♭	♮	♮	♭
#vi	#vidim^{maj7♭13♯11}	♮	♭	♭	♮	♮	♯	♭
vii^{o}	vii^{o}^{7♭9♭13}	♮	♭	♭	double flat	♭	♮	♭

Other thirteenth chord qualities do exist but they do not belong to any mode of the bebop scale.

From the table it is clear that adding an eleventh or a thirteenth makes the seven chord qualities distinguishable from each other, as without an eleventh added the I and IV chord quality would be identical, and without a thirteenth added the ii and vi chord quality would be identical.

== See also ==
- Added tone chord
- Elektra chord
- Hendrix chord
- Tristan chord
- Upper structure triad for an examination of extended harmony with emphasis on jazz and pop
- Chord alteration
- Chord progression
