= Minor major seventh chord =

Seventh chord composed of four notes

minor/major seventh chord
Component intervals from root
- major seventh
- perfect fifth
- minor third
- root

Tuning
- 40:48:60:75

Forte no. / Complement
- 4-19 / 8-19

A minor major seventh chord, or minor/major seventh chord is a seventh chord composed of a root, minor third, perfect fifth, and major seventh (1, ♭3, 5, and 7). It can be viewed as a minor triad with an additional major seventh. When using popular-music symbols, it is denoted by e.g. m^{(M7)}. For example, the minor major seventh chord built on A, written as e.g. Am^{(M7)}, has pitches A–C–E–G♯:

The chord can be represented by the integer notation {0, 3, 7, 11}.

== Use ==
The chord occurs on the tonic when harmonizing the harmonic minor scale in seventh chords. That is, the first, third, fifth, and seventh scale degrees of the harmonic minor scale form a minor major seventh chord, as shown below.

The harmonic minor scale has a raised seventh, creating a minor second (half step) between the seventh and the octave. This half step creates a pull (leading tone) to the tonic that is useful in harmonic context and is not present in the natural minor scale. Traditionally, in classical and jazz contexts, when building a chord on the dominant of the minor tonality, this raised seventh is present, and so both of these chords have a strong pull to the tonic.

This chord appears in classical music, but it is used more in the late Romantic period than in the Classical and Baroque periods. However, a striking example may be found in the final bar of Bach's St Matthew Passion. The chord occurs on the first beat, but the sharp seventh (B natural on the flutes) is resolved upwards to a C. John Eliot Gardiner hears this chord in context as an "unexpected and almost excruciating dissonance... the melody instruments insist on B natural—the jarring leading tone—before eventually melting in a C minor cadence."

Bach St Matthew Passion closing bars

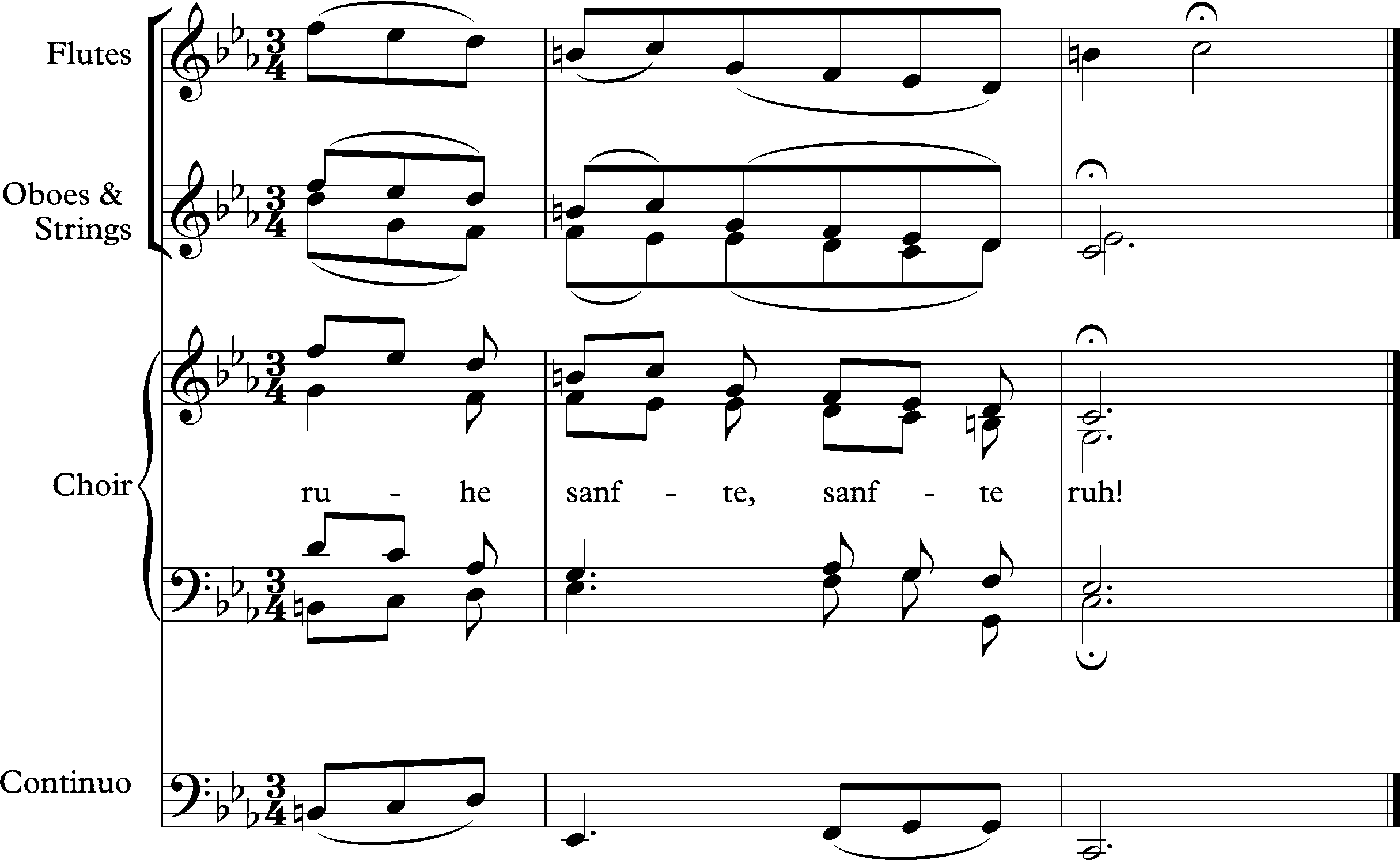
Closing bars of the final chorus of Bach's St Matthew Passion

The chord, which has Forte number 4-19, "may be regarded as the sonic emblem of music of the Second Viennese School because of its prevalence and multiple strategic functions." An example would be the chord that concludes the first movement of Alban Berg's Violin Concerto without resolving as Bach did, creating "an inconclusive final cadence" with "no decisive connotation of tonal closure".

Berg Violin Concerto, 1st movement closing bars

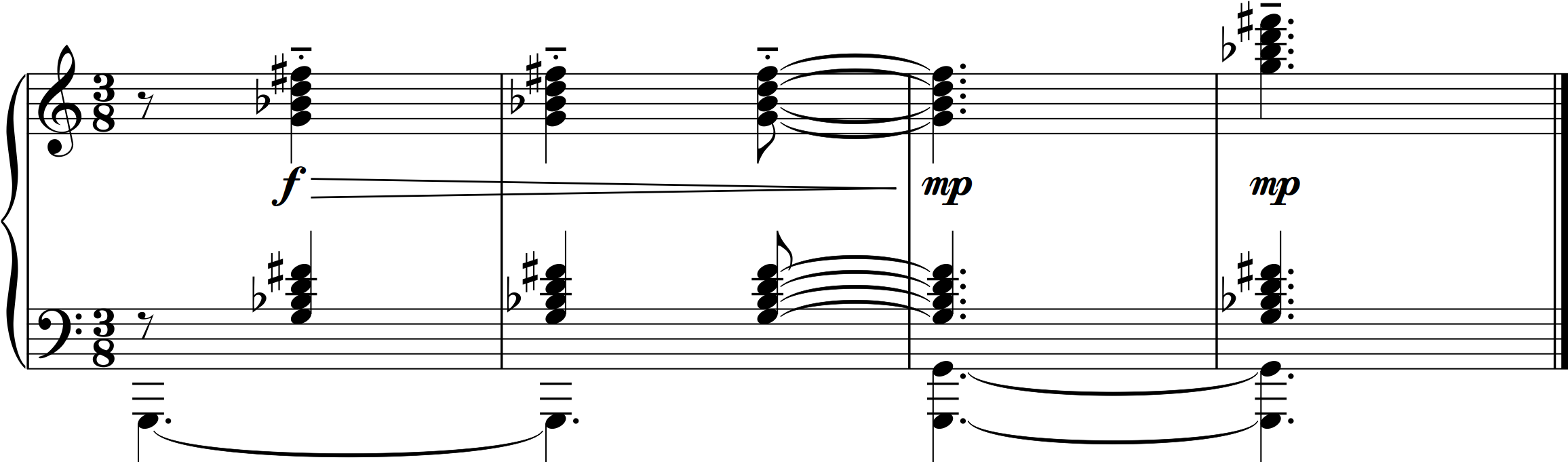
Berg Violin Concerto, 1st movement closing bars

The chord, initially sung by voices, also permeates the sound world of the opening movement of Luciano Berio's Sinfonia. Another notable use is in the fourth movement of Samuel Barber's Piano Sonata; the subject of the fugue begins with a minor major seventh chord presented as an arpeggio. The arpeggio is heard many times throughout the fugue. The minor major seventh chord is most often used in jazz, typically functioning as a minor tonic. Jazz musicians usually improvise with the melodic minor scale over this chord; the harmonic minor scale is also used. Additionally, Bernard Herrmann's use of this chord – most notoriously in his score for Psycho – has earned it the nickname, "The Hitchcock Chord" (named after the director, Alfred Hitchcock). In flamenco, guitarists often use this chord as an abstract chord to create atmosphere and it gives a Moorish feel with the tension between the minor and major. See for example, the guitar chord at Figure 8 of the second movement of Rodrigo's Concierto de Aranjuez. See also Benessa's dissertation for how this tension was used by the Moors during the Spanish Renaissance period to capture a surprisingly wide spectrum of emotions in their musical works.

The chord, infrequent in rock and popular music, is "virtually always found on the fourth scale degree in the major mode", thus making the seventh of the chord the third of the scale and perhaps explaining the rarity of the chord, given the "propensity of the third scale degree to be lowered as a blues alteration." Examples occur in Lesley Gore's "It's My Party" (see also augmented triad), the Chiffons' "One Fine Day", The Beatles' "Something", Mariah Carey's "Vision Of Love", Pink Floyd's "Us and Them", Toni Braxton's "I Don't Want To", Radiohead's "Life in a Glasshouse", The Cure's "In Your House" (1:12), Depeche Mode's "Jezebel", and Magdalena Bay's "Hysterical Us".

== Minor major seventh chord table ==
Chord	Root	Minor 3rd	Perfect 5th	Major 7th
Cm^{M7}	C	E♭	G	B
C♯m^{M7}	C♯	E	G♯	B♯ (C)
D♭m^{M7}	D♭	F♭ (E)	A♭	C
Dm^{M7}	D	F	A	C♯
D♯m^{M7}	D♯	F♯	A♯	C (D)
E♭m^{M7}	E♭	G♭	B♭	D
Em^{M7}	E	G	B	D♯
Fm^{M7}	F	A♭	C	E
F♯m^{M7}	F♯	A	C♯	E♯ (F)
G♭m^{M7}	G♭	B (A)	D♭	F
Gm^{M7}	G	B♭	D	F♯
G♯m^{M7}	G♯	B	D♯	F (G)
A♭m^{M7}	A♭	C♭ (B)	E♭	G
Am^{M7}	A	C	E	G♯
A♯m^{M7}	A♯	C♯	E♯ (F)	G (A)
B♭m^{M7}	B♭	D♭	F	A
Bm^{M7}	B	D	F♯	A♯
