= Eleventh (interval) =

Musical interval of ten diatonic steps

perfect eleventh
- Inverse: perfect fifth

Name
- Other names: Compound fourth
- Abbreviation: P11

Size
- Semitones: 17
- Interval class: 1
- Just interval: 8:3

Cents
- Equal temperament: 1700.0
- Just intonation: 1698.0

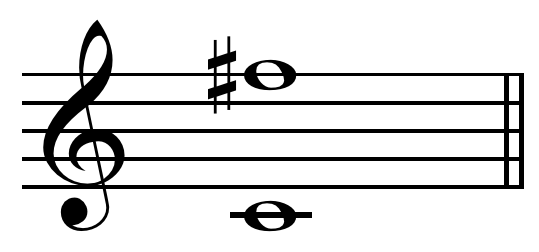
Augmented eleventh on C.

augmented eleventh
- Inverse: diminished fifth

Name
- Abbreviation: A11

Size
- Semitones: 18
- Interval class: 6
- Just interval: 45:16

Cents
- Equal temperament: 1800.0
- Just intonation: 1790.2

In music theory, an eleventh is a compound interval consisting of an octave plus a fourth. A perfect eleventh spans 17 and the augmented eleventh 18 semitones, or 10 steps in a diatonic scale. For instance, the interval between C_{4} and F_{5} (in scientific pitch notation) is a perfect eleventh.

Since there are only seven degrees in a diatonic scale, the eleventh degree is the same as the subdominant (IV).

An eleventh chord is the stacking of five thirds in the span of an eleventh. In common practice tonality, it usually had subdominant function as minor eleventh chord on the second degree (supertonic) of the major scale.

The quarter tone scale offers an alternative eleventh of 1650 cents, which is very close to the just interval 11:4, the undecimal eleventh (1651.3 cents).

== See also ==
- Eleventh chord
- Extended chord
