= Ninth (interval) =

In music, a ninth is a compound interval consisting of an octave plus a second. Like the second, the interval of a ninth is classified as a dissonance in common practice tonality. Since a ninth is an octave larger than a second, its sonority level is considered less dense.

== Major ninth ==
Major ninth
- Inverse: minor seventh

Name
- Other names: compound second
- Abbreviation: M9

Size
- Semitones: 14
- Interval class: 2
- Just interval: 9/4

Cents
- 12-Tone equal temperament: 1400.0
- Just intonation: 1403.9

A major ninth is a compound musical interval spanning 14 semitones, or an octave plus 2 semitones. For instance, the interval between C_{4} and D_{5} (in scientific pitch notation) is a major ninth.

If transposed into a single octave, it becomes a major second or minor seventh. The major ninth is somewhat dissonant in sound.

=== Transposition ===
Some common transposing instruments sound a major ninth lower than written. These include the tenor saxophone, the bass clarinet, the baritone/euphonium when written in treble clef, and the trombone when written in treble clef (British brass band music).

When baritone/euphonium or trombone parts are written in bass clef or tenor clef they sound as written.

== Minor ninth ==
Minor ninth
- Inverse: major seventh

Name
- Abbreviation: m9

Size
- Semitones: 13
- Interval class: 1

Cents
- 12-Tone equal temperament: 1300.0

A minor ninth (m9 or -9) is a compound musical interval spanning 13 semitones, or 1 semitone above an octave (thus it is enharmonically equivalent to an augmented octave). For instance, the interval between C_{4} and D♭_{5} (in scientific pitch notation) is a minor ninth.

If transposed into a single octave, it becomes a minor second or major seventh. The minor ninth is rather dissonant in sound, and in European classical music, often appears as a suspension.

The fourth movement (an intermezzo) of Robert Schumann's Faschingsschwank aus Wien is constructed to feature prominent notes of the melody a minor ninth above the accompaniment:

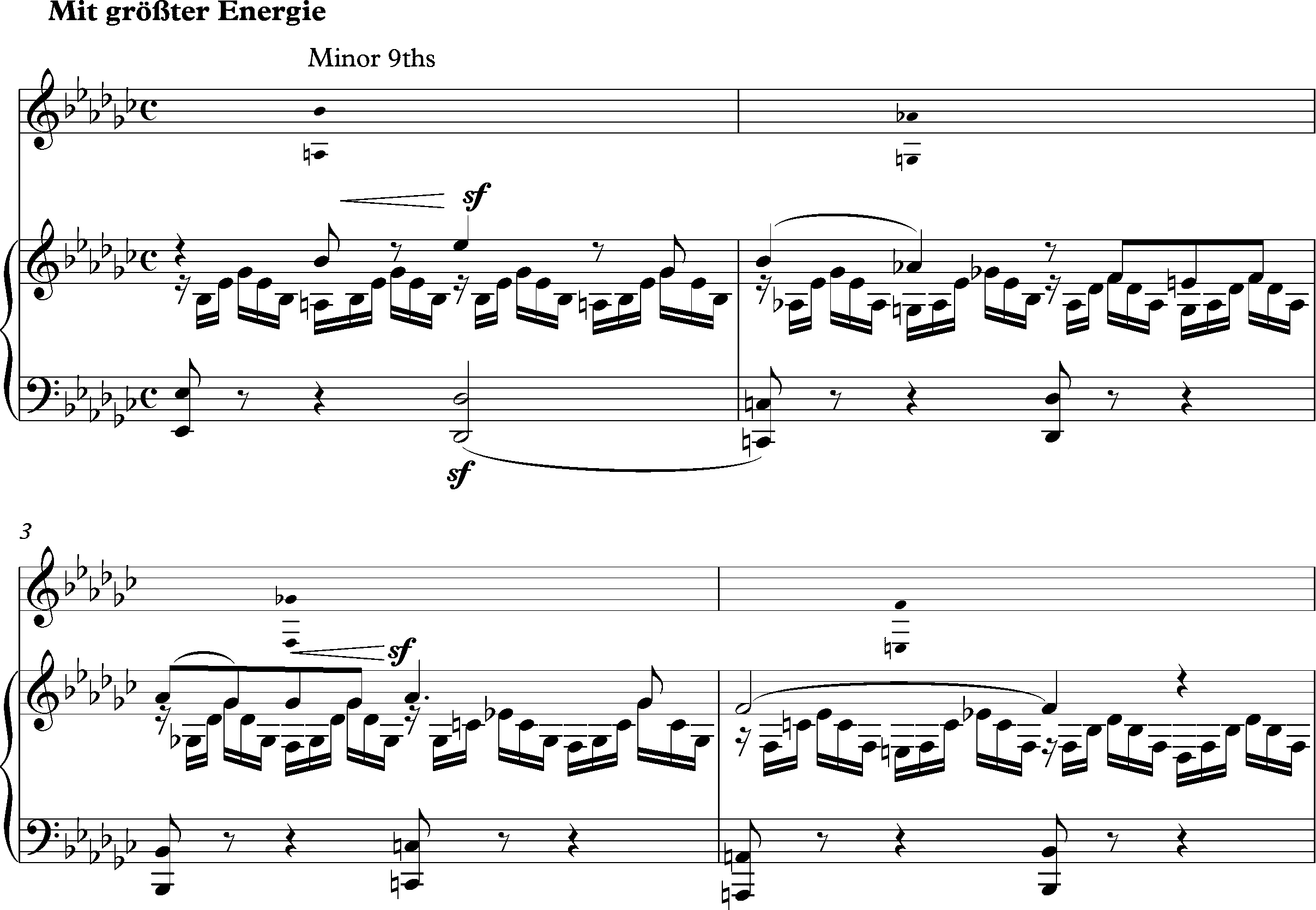
Schumann, Faschingsschwank Intermezzo, bars 1–4

Béla Bartók wrote a study in minor ninths for piano. Several of Igor Stravinsky's works open with a striking gesture that includes the interval of a minor 9th, either as a chord, as in Les noces and Threni, or as an upward melodic leap, as a in Capriccio for Piano and Orchestra, Symphony in Three Movements, and Movements for Piano and Orchestra.

== Augmented ninth ==
Augmented ninth
- Inverse: diminished seventh

Name
- Abbreviation: A9

Size
- Semitones: 15
- Interval class: 3

Cents
- 12-Tone equal temperament: 1500.0

An augmented ninth is a compound musical interval spanning 15 semitones, or 3 semitones above an octave. For instance, the interval between C_{4} and D♯_{5} (in scientific pitch notation) is a major ninth.

Enharmonically equivalent to a compound minor third, if transposed into a single octave, it becomes a minor third or major sixth.

== See also ==
- Augmented octave
- Augmented unison
