= List of tone rows and series =

This is a list of tone rows and series. For a list of unordered collections, see set (music), Forte number, list of set classes, and trope (music).

== Twelve tone rows ==
Row form	Integers	Interval classes	Notation	Composer: Composition	Year	Hexa-chord I	Hexa-chord II	Derivation/ Combina-toriality
P:	0 1 2 e t 9; 5 4 3 6 7 8	1 1 3 1 1 4 1 1 3 1 1		Anton Webern: Op. 32, later row	un- finished	6-1	6-1	—
I:	0 e t 1 2 3; 7 8 9 6 5 4	1 1 3 1 1 4 1 1 3 1 1		Anton Webern: Op. 32, later row	un- finished	6-1	6-1	—
P:	0 1 3 5 6 2; 4 8 7 9 e t	1 2 2 1 4 2 4 1 2 2 1		Igor Stravinsky: Abraham & Isaac	1963	6-Z3	6-Z36	—
I:	0 e 9 7 6 t 8 4 5 3 1 2	1 2 2 1 4 2 4 1 2 2 1		Igor Stravinsky: Abraham & Isaac	1963	6-Z3	6-Z36	—
P:	0 1 3 6 7 9; 8 t e 2 4 5	1 2 3 1 2 1 2 1 3 2 1		Arnold Schoenberg: Serenade, op. 24, mov. 5	1920–23	6-30	6-30	derived: 3-3
I:	0 e 9 6 5 3; 4 2 1 t 8 7	1 2 3 1 2 1 2 1 3 2 1		Arnold Schoenberg: Serenade, op. 24, mov. 5	1920–23	6-30	6-30	derived: 3-3
P:	0 1 3 8 4 9 t 7 6 5 e 2	1 2 5 4 5 1 3 1 1 6 3		Alban Berg: Kammerkonzert	1923–25	6-Z19	6-Z44	cryptogram: "Schoenberg"
I:	0 e 9 4 8 3; 2 5 6 7 1 t	1 2 5 4 5 1 3 1 1 6 3		Alban Berg: Kammerkonzert	1923–25	6-Z19	6-Z44	cryptogram: "Schoenberg"
P:	0 1 3 9 2 e 4 t 7 8 5 6	1 2 6 5 3 5 6 3 1 3 1		Arnold Schoenberg: Suite for Piano, op. 25	1921–23	6-2	6-2	—
I:	0 e 9 3 t 1; 8 2 5 4 7 6	1 2 6 5 3 5 6 3 1 3 1		Arnold Schoenberg: Suite for Piano, op. 25	1921–23	6-2	6-2	—
P:	0 1 4 2 9 5 e 3 8 t 7 6	1 3 2 5 4 6 4 5 2 3 1		Pohlman Mallalieu Robert Morris: Not Lilacs	n.a. 1973	6-14	6-14	all-interval, RT6-invariant
I:	0 e 8 t 3 7; 1 9 4 2 5 6	1 3 2 5 4 6 4 5 2 3 1		Pohlman Mallalieu Robert Morris: Not Lilacs	n.a. 1973	6-14	6-14	all-interval, RT6-invariant
P:	0 1 4 3 2 5; 6 9 8 7 t e	1 3 1 1 3 1 3 1 1 3 1		Anton Webern: Variations for Orchestra, Op. 30	1940	6-1	6-1	all- combinatorial
I:	0 e 8 9 t 7; 6 3 4 5 2 1	1 3 1 1 3 1 3 1 1 3 1		Anton Webern: Variations for Orchestra, Op. 30	1940	6-1	6-1	all- combinatorial
P:	0 1 4 3 2 5; 6 9 8 e t 7	1 3 1 1 3 1 3 1 3 1 3		Igor Stravinsky: Agon, "Pas de deux", "Four trios"	1957	6-1	6-1	all- combinatorial
I:	0 e 8 9 t 7; 6 3 4 1 2 5	1 3 1 1 3 1 3 1 3 1 3		Igor Stravinsky: Agon, "Pas de deux", "Four trios"	1957	6-1	6-1	all- combinatorial
P:	0 1 4 3 7 6 e 2 t 9 5 8	1 3 1 4 1 5 3 4 1 4 3		Arnold Schoenberg: Die Jakobsleiter	un- finished	6-Z13	6-Z42	—
I:	0 e 8 9 5 6; 1 t 2 3 7 4	1 3 1 4 1 5 3 4 1 4 3		Arnold Schoenberg: Die Jakobsleiter	un- finished	6-Z13	6-Z42	—
P:	0 1 4 5 8 7; 6 3 2 7 e t	1 3 1 3 1 1 3 1 5 4 1		Walter Piston: Symphony No. 8 (first movement)	1965	6-Z19	6-Z44	—
I:	0 e 8 7 4 5; 6 9 t 5 1 2	1 3 1 3 1 1 3 1 5 4 1		Walter Piston: Symphony No. 8 (first movement)	1965	6-Z19	6-Z44	—
P:	0 1 4 5 7 6; 8 9 t e 2 3	1 3 1 2 1 2 1 1 1 3 1		Roger Reynolds: Ambages	1965	6-5	6-5	—
I:	0 1 4 5 7 6; 8 9 t e 2 3	1 3 1 2 1 2 1 1 1 3 1		Roger Reynolds: Ambages	1965	6-5	6-5	—
P:	0 1 4 6 8 t 5 7 9 e 2 3	1 3 2 2 2 5 2 2 2 3 1		Ernst Krenek: Lamentatio Jeremiae Prophetae, Op. 93, row 3	1940–41	6-34	6-34	RI-symmetry
I:	0 e 8 6 4 2; 7 5 3 1 t 9	1 3 2 2 2 5 2 2 2 3 1		Ernst Krenek: Lamentatio Jeremiae Prophetae, Op. 93, row 3	1940–41	6-34	6-34	RI-symmetry
P:	0 1 4 9 5 8; 3 t 2 e 6 7	1 3 5 4 3 5 5 4 3 5 1		Milton Babbitt: Composition for Twelve Instruments	1948	6-20	6-20	dyadic, tri-, tetra-, and hexa- chordal combina- toriality
I:	0 e 8 3 7 4; 9 2 t 1 6 5	1 3 5 4 3 5 5 4 3 5 1		Milton Babbitt: Composition for Twelve Instruments	1948	6-20	6-20	dyadic, tri-, tetra-, and hexa- chordal combina- toriality
P:	0 1 5 2 6 t 3 8 9 4 7 e	1 4 3 4 4 5 5 1 5 3 4		Edison Denisov: Fünf Geschichten von Herrn Keuner	1966	6-Z43	6-Z17	all-trichord hexachord
I:	0 e 7 t 6 2; 9 4 3 8 5 1	1 4 3 4 4 5 5 1 5 3 4		Edison Denisov: Fünf Geschichten von Herrn Keuner	1966	6-Z43	6-Z17	all-trichord hexachord
P:	0 1 5 8 t 4; 3 7 9 2 e 6	1 4 3 2 6 1 4 2 5 3 5		Luigi Dallapiccola: Quaderno musicale di Annalibera; Variazioni per orchestra Canti di Liberazione	1952; 1954; 1951–55	6-31	6-31	—
I:	0 e 7 4 2 8; 9 5 3 t 1 6	1 4 3 2 6 1 4 2 5 3 5		Luigi Dallapiccola: Quaderno musicale di Annalibera; Variazioni per orchestra Canti di Liberazione	1952; 1954; 1951–55	6-31	6-31	—
P:	0 1 6 2 7 9; 3 4 t e 5 8	1 5 4 5 2 6 1 6 1 6 3		Arnold Schoenberg: Violin Concerto, op. 36	1936	6-Z50	6-Z29	—
I:	0 e 6 t 5 3; 9 8 2 1 7 4	1 5 4 5 2 6 1 6 1 6 3		Arnold Schoenberg: Violin Concerto, op. 36	1936	6-Z50	6-Z29	—
P:	0 1 6 2 t 9; 4 7 3 8 e 5	1 5 4 4 1 5 3 4 5 3 6		Arnold Schoenberg: A Survivor from Warsaw	1947	6-15	6-15	—
I:	0 e 6 t 2 3; 8 5 9 4 1 7	1 5 4 4 1 5 3 4 5 3 6		Arnold Schoenberg: A Survivor from Warsaw	1947	6-15	6-15	—
P:	0 1 6 5 7 e 2 t 3 9 8 4	1 5 1 2 4 3 4 5 6 1 4		Milton Babbitt: All Set	1957	6-7	6-7	second-order all- combinatorial hexachord
I:	0 e 6 7 5 1 t 2 9 3 4 8	1 5 1 2 4 3 4 5 6 1 4		Milton Babbitt: All Set	1957	6-7	6-7	second-order all- combinatorial hexachord
P:	0 1 7 2 3 9 t 8 6 5 e 4	1 6 5 1 6 1 2 2 1 6 5		Edison Denisov: Viola concerto	1986	6-Z41	6-Z12	—
I:	0 e 5 t 9 3; 2 4 6 7 1 8	1 6 5 1 6 1 2 2 1 6 5		Edison Denisov: Viola concerto	1986	6-Z41	6-Z12	—
P:	0 1 7 5 6 4 t 8 9 e 2 3	1 6 2 1 2 6 2 1 2 3 1		Arnold Schoenberg: Moses und Aron	un- finished	6-5	6-5	inversional
I:	0 e 5 7 6 8; 2 4 3 1 t 9	1 6 2 1 2 6 2 1 2 3 1		Arnold Schoenberg: Moses und Aron	un- finished	6-5	6-5	inversional
P:	0 1 7 5 6 e 9 8 t 3 4 2	1 6 2 1 5 2 1 2 5 1 2		Igor Stravinsky: Movements	1958–59	6-7	6-7	—
I:	0 e 5 7 6 1; 3 4 2 9 8 t	1 6 2 1 5 2 1 2 5 1 2		Igor Stravinsky: Movements	1958–59	6-7	6-7	—
P:	0 1 7 6 8 9; 3 2 4 5 e t	1 6 1 2 1 6 1 2 1 6 1		Alberto Ginastera: Don Rodrigo, Act I, op. 31	1963–64	6-5	6-5	—
I:	0 e 5 6 4 3; 9 t 8 7 1 2	1 6 1 2 1 6 1 2 1 6 1		Alberto Ginastera: Don Rodrigo, Act I, op. 31	1963–64	6-5	6-5	—
P:	0 1 7 9 8 6; 3 t 2 5 e 4	1 6 2 1 2 3 5 4 3 6 5		Karlheinz Stockhausen: Plus-Minus	1963 (rev. 1974)	6-5	6-5	—
I:	0 e 5 3 4 6; 9 2 t 7 1 8	1 6 2 1 2 3 5 4 3 6 5		Karlheinz Stockhausen: Plus-Minus	1963 (rev. 1974)	6-5	6-5	—
P:	0 1 7 e 8 2; 6 5 t 9 3 4	1 6 4 3 6 4 1 5 1 6 1		Schoenberg: "Tot" ["Lifeless"], Drei Lieder, Op. 48	1933	6-5	6-5	—
I:	0 e 5 1 4 t 6 7 2 3 9 8	1 6 4 3 6 4 1 5 1 6 1		Schoenberg: "Tot" ["Lifeless"], Drei Lieder, Op. 48	1933	6-5	6-5	—
P:	0 1 8 e 7 3; 2 5 4 t 9 6	1 5 3 4 4 1 3 1 6 1 3		Karlheinz Stockhausen: Zeitmaße	1955–56	6-16	6-16	—
I:	0 e 4 1 5 9 t 7 8 2 3 6	1 5 3 4 4 1 3 1 6 1 3		Karlheinz Stockhausen: Zeitmaße	1955–56	6-16	6-16	—
P:	0 1 9 e 3 2; 6 7 t 8 4 5	1 4 2 4 1 4 1 3 2 4 1		Anton Webern: Op. 32, row 1	un- finished	6-2	6-2	—
I:	0 e 3 1 9 t 6 5 2 4 8 7	1 4 2 4 1 4 1 3 2 4 1		Anton Webern: Op. 32, row 1	un- finished	6-2	6-2	—
P:	0 1 9 e 3 2; 7 6 t 8 4 5	1 4 2 4 1 5 1 4 2 4 1		Anton Webern: Op. 32, row 2	un- finished	6-1	6-1	all- combinatorial
I:	0 e 3 1 9 t 5 6 2 4 8 7	1 4 2 4 1 5 1 4 2 4 1		Anton Webern: Op. 32, row 2	un- finished	6-1	6-1	all- combinatorial
P:	0 1 9 e 8 t 4 5 6 2 3 7	1 4 2 3 2 6 1 1 4 1 4		Anton Webern: Variations for piano, mov. II, op. 27	1936	6-1	6-1	all- combinatorial
I:	0 e 3 1 4 2; 8 7 6 t 9 5	1 4 2 3 2 6 1 1 4 1 4		Anton Webern: Variations for piano, mov. II, op. 27	1936	6-1	6-1	all- combinatorial
P:	0 1 9 e t 7; 8 3 4 6 5 2	1 4 2 1 3 1 5 1 2 1 3		Igor Stravinsky: A Sermon, a Narrative and a Prayer	1961	6-2	6-2	—
I:	0 e 3 1 2 5; 4 9 8 6 7 t	1 4 2 1 3 1 5 1 2 1 3		Igor Stravinsky: A Sermon, a Narrative and a Prayer	1961	6-2	6-2	—
P:	0 1 t 2 6 4; 5 3 7 e 8 9	1 3 4 4 2 1 2 4 4 3 1		Luigi Dallapiccola: Dialoghi		6-21	6-21	RI-invariant: P0 = RI9
I:	0 e 2 t 6 8; 7 9 5 1 4 3	1 3 4 4 2 1 2 4 4 3 1		Luigi Dallapiccola: Dialoghi		6-21	6-21	RI-invariant: P0 = RI9
P:	0 1 t 3 4 6; 8 9 e 5 7 2	1 3 5 1 2 2 1 2 6 2 5		Chen Yi: Near Distance	1988	6-Z23	6-Z45	—
I:	0 e 2 9 8 6; 4 3 1 7 5 t	1 3 5 1 2 2 1 2 6 2 5		Chen Yi: Near Distance	1988	6-Z23	6-Z45	—
P:	0 1 e 2 t 3; 9 4 8 5 7 6	1 2 3 4 5 6 5 4 3 2 1		Luigi Nono: Canti per tredeci Il canto sospeso Composizione per orchestra n. 2: Diario polacco ’58	1955; 1955–56; 1959	6-1	6-1	symmetrical all-interval row; all- combinatorial
I:	0 e 1 t 2 9; 3 8 4 7 5 6	1 2 3 4 5 6 5 4 3 2 1		Nicolas Slonimsky: Grandmother chord	1938	6-1	6-1	symmetrical all-interval row; all- combinatorial
P:	0 2 1 3 8 7; 5 6 4 e 9 t	2 1 2 5 1 2 1 2 5 2 1		Joonas Kokkonen: Symphonic Sketches, mov. 3, row A	1968	6-Z38	6-Z6	—
I:	0 t e 9 4 5; 7 6 8 1 3 2	2 1 2 5 1 2 1 2 5 2 1		Joonas Kokkonen: Symphonic Sketches, mov. 3, row A	1968	6-Z38	6-Z6	—
P:	0 2 1 3 4 6; 7 9 8 t 5 e	2 1 2 1 2 1 2 1 2 5 6		Igor Stravinsky: Agon, second coda	1957	6-2	6-2	—
I:	0 t e 9 8 6; 5 3 4 2 7 1	2 1 2 1 2 1 2 1 2 5 6		Igor Stravinsky: coda	1957	6-2	6-2	—
P:	0 2 1 3 4 6; 7 9 8 t 5 e	2 1 2 1 2 1 2 1 2 5 6		Igor Stravinsky: The Flood	1962	6-Z12	6-Z41	—
I:	0 t e 5 2 4; 3 1 9 8 6 7	2 1 2 1 2 1 2 1 2 5 6		Igor Stravinsky: The Flood	1962	6-Z12	6-Z41	—
P:	0 2 1 3 4 6; 7 9 8 t 5 e	2 1 2 1 2 1 2 1 2 5 6		Luigi Dallapiccola: Requiescant		6-5	6-5	RI-invariant: P0 = RI5
I:	0 t e 5 1 4; 3 6 2 8 9 7	2 1 2 1 2 1 2 1 2 5 6		Luigi Dallapiccola: Requiescant		6-5	6-5	RI-invariant: P0 = RI5
P:	0 2 1 3 4 6; 7 9 8 t 5 e	2 1 2 1 2 1 2 1 2 5 6		Alfred Schnittke: String Quartet No. 1	1966	6-1	6-1	all- combinatorial
I:	0 t e 2 9 1; 7 3 8 5 4 6	2 1 2 1 2 1 2 1 2 5 6		Alfred Schnittke: String Quartet No. 1	1966	6-1	6-1	all- combinatorial
P:	0 2 3 1 4 5; 6 7 8 9 e t	2 1 2 3 1 1 1 1 1 2 1		Alban Berg: Lulu, Schigolch	1934	6-1	6-1	all- combinatorial, derived: 4–1
I:	0 t 9 e 8 7; 6 5 4 3 1 2	2 1 2 3 1 1 1 1 1 2 1		Alban Berg: Lulu, Schigolch	1934	6-1	6-1	all- combinatorial, derived: 4–1
P:	0 2 3 5 4 9; 7 8 t e 1 6	2 1 2 1 5 2 1 2 1 2 5		Igor Stravinsky: Agon, "Bransles"	1957	6-Z40	6-Z11	—
I:	0 t 9 7 8 3; 5 4 2 1 e 6	2 1 2 1 5 2 1 2 1 2 5		Igor Stravinsky: Agon, "Bransles"	1957	6-Z40	6-Z11	—
P:	0 2 3 5 7 8 e 4 6 t 8 1	2 1 2 2 1 3 5 2 4 2 5		Alban Berg: "Der Wein"	1929	6-16	6-16	D harmonic minor & in the inverted row-form added-sixth chord with both major and minor third
I:	0 t 9 7 5 4; 1 8 6 2 4 e	2 1 2 2 1 3 5 2 4 2 5		Alban Berg: "Der Wein"	1929	6-16	6-16	D harmonic minor & in the inverted row-form added-sixth chord with both major and minor third
P:	0 2 3 6 8 t 5 7 9 e 1 4	2 1 3 2 2 5 2 2 2 2 3		Ernst Krenek: Lamentatio Jeremiae Prophetae, Op. 93, row 2	1940–41	6-34	6-34	RI-symmetry
I:	0 t 9 6 4 2; 7 5 3 1 e 8	2 1 3 2 2 5 2 2 2 2 3		Ernst Krenek: Lamentatio Jeremiae Prophetae, Op. 93, row 2	1940–41	6-34	6-34	RI-symmetry
P:	0 2 4 5 8 t 6 7 9 e 1 3	2 2 1 3 2 4 1 2 2 2 2		Ernst Krenek: Lamentatio Jeremiae Prophetae, Op. 93, row 1	1940–41	6-34	6-34	RI-symmetry
I:	0 t 8 7 4 2; 6 5 3 1 e 9	2 2 1 3 2 4 1 2 2 2 2		Ernst Krenek: Lamentatio Jeremiae Prophetae, Op. 93, row 1	1940–41	6-34	6-34	RI-symmetry
P:	0 2 4 6 7 t 5 8 9 e 1 3	2 2 2 1 3 5 3 1 2 2 2		Ernst Krenek: Lamentatio Jeremiae Prophetae, Op. 93, row 6	1940–41	6-34	6-34	RI-symmetry
I:	0 t 8 6 5 2; 7 4 3 1 e 9	2 2 2 1 3 5 3 1 2 2 2		Ernst Krenek: Lamentatio Jeremiae Prophetae, Op. 93, row 6	1940–41	6-34	6-34	RI-symmetry
P:	0 2 4 6 8 9; 5 7 t e 1 3	2 2 2 2 1 4 2 3 1 2 2		Ernst Krenek: Lamentatio Jeremiae Prophetae, Op. 93, row 5	1940–41	6-34	6-34	RI-symmetry
I:	0 t 8 6 4 3; 7 5 2 1 e 9	2 2 2 2 1 4 2 3 1 2 2		Ernst Krenek: Lamentatio Jeremiae Prophetae, Op. 93, row 5	1940–41	6-34	6-34	RI-symmetry
P:	0 2 4 6 t 8 e 7 9 1 3 5	2 2 2 4 2 3 4 2 4 2 2		Alban Berg: Lulu	1934	6-35	6-35	—
I:	0 t 8 6 2 4; 1 5 3 e 9 7	2 2 2 4 2 3 4 2 4 2 2		Alban Berg: Lulu	1934	6-35	6-35	—
P:	0 2 5 3 t 4; 6 1 e 7 8 9	2 3 2 5 6 2 5 2 4 1 1		Igor Stravinsky: Variations	1963–64	6-9	6-9	—
I:	0 t 7 9 2 8; 6 e 1 5 4 3	2 3 2 5 6 2 5 2 4 1 1		Igor Stravinsky: Variations	1963–64	6-9	6-9	—
P:	0 2 6 4 t 9; 7 e 8 5 1 3	2 4 2 6 1 2 4 3 3 4 2		Arnold Schoenberg: Piano Piece [Klavierstück], op. 33b	1931	6-34	6-34	—
I:	0 t 6 8 2 3; 5 1 4 7 e 9	2 4 2 6 1 2 4 3 3 4 2		Arnold Schoenberg: Piano Piece [Klavierstück], op. 33b	1931	6-34	6-34	—
P:	0 2 6 t 4 7; 8 3 5 9 e 1	2 4 4 6 3 1 5 2 4 2 2		Alban Berg: Lulu, Schoolboy	1934	6-34	6-34	—
I:	0 t 6 2 8 5; 4 9 7 3 1 e	2 4 4 6 3 1 5 2 4 2 2		Alban Berg: Lulu, Schoolboy	1934	6-34	6-34	—
P:	0 2 9 e 8 6; 5 7 t 1 4 3	2 5 2 3 2 1 2 3 3 3 1		Igor Stravinsky: The Owl and the Pussy Cat	1966	6-Z23	6-Z45	—
I:	0 t 3 1 4 6; 7 5 2 e 8 9	2 5 2 3 2 1 2 3 3 3 1		Igor Stravinsky: The Owl and the Pussy Cat	1966	6-Z23	6-Z45	—
P:	0 7 6 5 8 9; 4 3 t e 2 1	5 1 1 3 1 5 1 5 1 3 1		Karel Goeyvaerts: Nummer 2	1951	6-Z36	6-Z3	—
I:	0 5 6 7 4 3; 8 9 2 1 t e	5 1 1 3 1 5 1 5 1 3 1		Karel Goeyvaerts: Nummer 2	1951	6-Z36	6-Z3	—
P:	0 2 t e 1 8; 6 7 9 4 3 5	2 4 1 2 5 2 1 2 5 1 2		Igor Stravinsky: Requiem Canticles, 1st series	1966	6-2	6-2	—
I:	0 t 2 1 e 4; 6 5 3 8 9 7	2 4 1 2 5 2 1 2 5 1 2		Igor Stravinsky: Requiem Canticles, 1st series	1966	6-2	6-2	—
P:	0 2 e 9 t 1; 3 6 4 5 7 8	2 3 2 1 3 2 3 2 1 2 1		Joonas Kokkonen: Woodwind Quintet, mov. 1 & 2, row A & B	1973	6-1	6-1	all- combinatorial
I:	0 t 1 3 2 e 9 6 8 7 5 4	2 3 2 1 3 2 3 2 1 2 1		Joonas Kokkonen: Woodwind Quintet, mov. 1 & 2, row A & B	1973	6-1	6-1	all- combinatorial
P:	0 2 e 9 t 4; 3 7 5 6 8 1	2 3 2 1 6 1 4 2 1 2 5		Arnold Schoenberg: Dreimal Tausend Jahre, Op. 50a	1949	6-9	6-9	—
I:	0 t 1 3 2 8; 9 5 7 6 4 e	2 3 2 1 6 1 4 2 1 2 5		Arnold Schoenberg: Dreimal Tausend Jahre, Op. 50a	1949	6-9	6-9	—
P:	0 3 1 2 4 7; 5 6 8 e 9 t	3 2 1 2 3 2 1 2 3 2 1		Arvo Pärt: Symphony No. 2	1966	6-Z36	6-Z3	derived: 4–1
I:	0 9 e t 8 5; 7 6 4 1 3 2	3 2 1 2 3 2 1 2 3 2 1		Arvo Pärt: Symphony No. 2	1966	6-Z36	6-Z3	derived: 4–1
P:	0 3 1 2 e t 8 9 5 7 6 4	3 2 1 3 1 2 1 4 2 1 2		Milton Babbitt: Woodwind Quartet	1953	6-1	6-1	—
I:	0 9 e t 1 2; 4 3 7 5 6 8	3 2 1 3 1 2 1 4 2 1 2		Milton Babbitt: Woodwind Quartet	1953	6-1	6-1	—
P:	0 3 1 6 2 4 t 5 9 7 8 e	3 2 5 4 2 6 5 4 2 1 3		Ernst Krenek: Sechs Vermessene, Op. 168	1958	6-2	6-2	—
I:	0 9 e 6 t 8; 2 7 3 5 4 1	3 2 5 4 2 6 5 4 2 1 3		Ernst Krenek: Sechs Vermessene, Op. 168	1958	6-2	6-2	—
P:	0 3 1 6 2 t 9 8 e 7 5 4	3 2 5 4 4 1 1 3 4 2 1		Ernst Krenek: Karl V	1938	6-Z39	6-Z10	—
I:	0 9 e 6 t 2; 3 4 1 5 7 8	3 2 5 4 4 1 1 3 4 2 1		Ernst Krenek: Karl V	1938	6-Z39	6-Z10	—
P:	0 3 1 t 2 8 e 5 6 9 7 4	3 2 3 4 6 3 6 1 3 2 3		Donald Martino: Fantasy Variations	1962	6-9	6-9	—
I:	0 9 e 2 t 4; 1 7 6 3 5 8	3 2 3 4 6 3 6 1 3 2 3		Donald Martino: Fantasy Variations	1962	6-9	6-9	—
P:	0 3 2 1 4 8 e 5 t 7 6 9	3 1 1 3 4 3 6 5 3 1 3		Benjamin Frankel: The Curse of the Werewolf	1961	6-Z37	6-Z4	—
I:	0 9 t e 8 4; 1 7 2 5 6 3	3 1 1 3 4 3 6 5 3 1 3		Benjamin Frankel: The Curse of the Werewolf	1961	6-Z37	6-Z4	—
P:	0 3 2 9 7 8 e 6 1 5 4 t	3 1 5 2 1 3 5 5 4 1 6		Karlheinz Stockhausen: "Aries", from Tierkreis	1974–75	6-18	6-18	—
I:	0 9 t 3 5 4; 1 6 e 7 8 2	3 1 5 2 1 3 5 5 4 1 6		Karlheinz Stockhausen: "Aries", from Tierkreis	1974–75	6-18	6-18	—
P:	0 3 2 1 5 4 t e 7 8 9 6	3 1 1 4 1 6 1 4 1 1 3		Anton Webern: Symphony, Op. 21	1928	6-1	6-1	all- combinatorial
I:	0 9 t e 7 8; 2 1 5 4 3 6	3 1 1 4 1 6 1 4 1 1 3		Anton Webern: Symphony, Op. 21	1928	6-1	6-1	all- combinatorial
P:	0 3 4 6 e 8; 7 t 9 5 1 2	3 1 2 5 3 1 3 1 4 4 1		Igor Stravinsky: Agon, "Mystery" (sketches only)	1957	6-31	6-31	—
I:	0 9 8 6 1 4; 5 2 3 7 e t	3 1 2 5 3 1 3 1 4 4 1		Igor Stravinsky: Agon, "Mystery" (sketches only)	1957	6-31	6-31	—
P:	0 3 5 1 2 6; 4 e 7 8 e 9	3 2 4 1 4 2 5 4 1 3 2		Karlheinz Stockhausen: Klavierstück IV (second row of 48)	1952	6-Z3	6-Z36	—
I:	0 9 7 e t 6; 8 1 5 4 1 3	3 2 4 1 4 2 5 4 1 3 2		Karlheinz Stockhausen: Klavierstück IV (second row of 48)	1952	6-Z3	6-Z36	—
P:	0 3 5 4 e t 9 8 7 6 2 1	3 2 1 5 1 1 1 1 1 4 1		Karlheinz Stockhausen: "Aquarius", from Tierkreis	1974–75	6-Z6	6-Z38	—
I:	0 9 7 8 1 2; 3 4 5 6 t e	3 2 1 5 1 1 1 1 1 4 1		Karlheinz Stockhausen: "Aquarius", from Tierkreis	1974–75	6-Z6	6-Z38	—
P:	0 3 5 7 9 e 6 8 t 1 2 4	3 2 2 2 2 5 2 2 3 1 2		Ernst Krenek: Lamentatio Jeremiae Prophetae, Op. 93, row 4	1940–41	6-34	6-34	RI-symmetry
I:	0 9 7 5 3 1; 6 4 2 e t 8	3 2 2 2 2 5 2 2 3 1 2		Ernst Krenek: Lamentatio Jeremiae Prophetae, Op. 93, row 4	1940–41	6-34	6-34	RI-symmetry
P:	0 3 7 e 2 5; 9 1 4 6 8 t	3 4 4 3 3 4 4 3 2 2 2		Alban Berg: Violin Concerto	1935	6-Z24	6-Z46	—
I:	0 9 5 1 t 7; 3 e 8 6 4 2	3 4 4 3 3 4 4 3 2 2 2		Alban Berg: Violin Concerto	1935	6-Z24	6-Z46	—
P:	0 3 e 2 t 1; 9 5 8 4 7 6	3 4 3 4 3 4 4 3 4 3 1		Anton Webern: "Erlösung" from Drei Lieder, Op. 18, No. 2	1910–13	6-1	6-1	all- combinatorial
I:	0 9 1 t 2 e 3 7 4 8 5 6	3 4 3 4 3 4 4 3 4 3 1		Anton Webern: "Erlösung" from Drei Lieder, Op. 18, No. 2	1910–13	6-1	6-1	all- combinatorial
P:	0 3 e 4 2 1; 7 8 t 5 9 6	3 4 5 2 1 6 1 2 5 4 3		Ernst Krenek: Quaestio temporis, Op. 170	1959	6-1	6-1	all- combinatorial retrograde-symmetry
I:	0 9 1 8 t e 5 4 2 7 3 6	3 4 5 2 1 6 1 2 5 4 3		Ernst Krenek: Quaestio temporis, Op. 170	1959	6-1	6-1	all- combinatorial retrograde-symmetry
P:	0 3 e t 2 9; 1 5 4 8 7 6	3 4 1 4 5 4 4 1 4 1 1		Anton Webern: Op. 31	1941–43	6-Z3	6-Z36	—
I:	0 9 1 2 t 3 e 7 8 4 5 6	3 4 1 4 5 4 4 1 4 1 1		Anton Webern: Op. 31	1941–43	6-Z3	6-Z36	—
P:	0 4 1 8 5 9; 3 e 2 7 t 6	4 3 5 3 4 6 4 3 5 3 4		Milton Babbitt: Composition for Four Instruments, row iv	1948	6–20	6–20	all- combinatorial hexachord
I:	0 8 e 4 7 3; 9 1 t 5 2 6	4 3 5 3 4 6 4 3 5 3 4		Milton Babbitt: Composition for Four Instruments, row iv	1948	6–20	6–20	all- combinatorial hexachord
P:	0 4 1 e 3 2; 8 6 5 t 7 9	4 3 2 4 1 6 2 1 5 3 2		Milton Babbitt: Composition for Four Instruments	1948	6–1	6–1	all- combinatorial hexachord
I:	0 8 e 1 9 t 4 6 7 2 5 3	4 3 2 4 1 6 2 1 5 3 2		Milton Babbitt: Composition for Four Instruments	1948	6–1	6–1	all- combinatorial hexachord
P:	0 4 2 5 7 8 t 9 e 1 6 3	4 2 3 2 1 2 1 2 2 5 3		Igor Stravinsky: Anthem	1962	6–33	6–33	—
I:	0 8 t 7 5 4; 2 3 1 e 6 9	4 2 3 2 1 2 1 2 2 5 3		Igor Stravinsky: Anthem	1962	6–33	6–33	—
P:	0 4 3 2 5 6 t e 9 1 7 8	4 1 1 3 1 4 1 2 4 6 1		Karlheinz Stockhausen: Licht, Eve formula	1977– 2003	6–2	6–2	—
I:	0 8 9 t 7 6; 2 1 3 e 5 4	4 1 1 3 1 4 1 2 4 6 1		Karlheinz Stockhausen: Licht, Eve formula	1977– 2003	6–2	6–2	—
P:	0 4 3 7 e 8; 9 6 5 1 2 t	4 1 4 4 3 1 3 1 4 1 4		Arnold Schoenberg: Ode to Napoleon Buonaparte; Suite Op. 29 Luigi Nono: Variazioni canoniche sulla serie dell'op. 41 di Arnold Schönberg	1942; 1926 1950	6–20	6–20	all- combinatorial
I:	0 8 9 5 1 4; 3 6 7 e t 2	4 1 4 4 3 1 3 1 4 1 4		Arnold Schoenberg: Ode to Napoleon Buonaparte; Suite Op. 29 Luigi Nono: Variazioni canoniche sulla serie dell'op. 41 di Arnold Schönberg	1942; 1926 1950	6–20	6–20	all- combinatorial
P:	0 4 3 8 7 e 5 1 2 9 t 6	4 1 5 1 4 6 4 1 5 1 4		Milton Babbitt: Composition for Four Instruments, row iii	1948	6–20	6–20	all- combinatorial hexachord
I:	0 8 9 4 5 1; 7 e t 3 2 6	4 1 5 1 4 6 4 1 5 1 4		Milton Babbitt: Composition for Four Instruments, row iii	1948	6–20	6–20	all- combinatorial hexachord
P:	0 4 3 e 7 8 t 9 2 5 1 6	4 1 4 4 1 2 1 5 3 4 5		Karlheinz Stockhausen: "Scorpio", from Tierkreis	1974–75	6–20	6–20	—
I:	0 8 9 1 5 4; 2 3 t 7 e 6	4 1 4 4 1 2 1 5 3 4 5		Karlheinz Stockhausen: "Scorpio", from Tierkreis	1974–75	6–20	6–20	—
P:	0 4 3 e t 9; 1 7 8 6 2 5	4 1 4 1 1 4 6 1 2 4 3		Ernst Krenek: Suite, Op. 84 for solo cello		6–5	6–5	—
I:	0 8 9 1 2 3 e 5 4 6 t 7	4 1 4 1 1 4 6 1 2 4 3		Ernst Krenek: Suite, Op. 84 for solo cello		6–5	6–5	—
P:	0 4 5 2 6 7; 8 9 e t 3 1	4 1 3 4 1 1 1 2 1 5 2		Alban Berg: Lulu	1934	6–9	6–9	—
I:	0 8 7 t 6 5; 4 3 1 2 9 e	4 1 3 4 1 1 1 2 1 5 2		Alban Berg: Lulu	1934	6–9	6–9	—
P:	0 4 5 2 7 9; 6 8 e t 3 1	4 1 3 5 2 3 2 3 1 5 2		Alban Berg: Lulu, Basic	1934	6–32	6–32	circle of fifths
I:	0 8 7 t 5 3; 6 4 1 2 9 e	4 1 3 5 2 3 2 3 1 5 2		Alban Berg: Lulu, Basic	1934	6–32	6–32	circle of fifths
P:	0 4 5 e 6 t 7 3 1 2 9 8	4 1 6 5 4 3 4 2 1 5 1		Milton Babbitt: All Set	1957	6–7	6–7	second-order all- combinatorial hexachord
I:	0 8 7 1 6 2; 5 9 e t 3 4	4 1 6 5 4 3 4 2 1 5 1		Milton Babbitt: All Set	1957	6–7	6–7	second-order all- combinatorial hexachord
P:	0 4 5 t 7 6; 1 8 e 2 9 3	4 1 5 3 1 5 5 3 3 5 6		Karlheinz Stockhausen: "Gemini", from Tierkreis	1974–75	6-Z41	6-Z12	—
I:	0 8 7 2 5 6 e 4 1 t 3 9	4 1 5 3 1 5 5 3 3 5 6		Karlheinz Stockhausen: "Gemini", from Tierkreis	1974–75	6-Z41	6-Z12	—
P:	0 4 8 9 3 2 t e 7 6 5 1	4 4 1 6 1 4 1 4 1 1 4		Robert Moevs: Three Symphonic Pieces, mov. 2	1954–55	6-Z17	6-Z43	all-trichord hexachord
I:	0 8 4 3 9 t 2 1 5 6 7 e	4 4 1 6 1 4 1 4 1 1 4		Robert Moevs: Three Symphonic Pieces, mov. 2	1954–55	6-Z17	6-Z43	all-trichord hexachord
P:	0 4 t 6 3 8; 7 2 5 9 1 e	4 6 4 3 5 1 5 3 4 4 2		Juan Carlos Paz: Canciones y Baladas, Balada II	1936	6–34	6–34	—
I:	0 8 2 6 9 4; 5 t 7 3 e 1	4 6 4 3 5 1 5 3 4 4 2		Juan Carlos Paz: Canciones y Baladas, Balada II	1936	6–34	6–34	—
P:	0 5 1 2 3 9; 8 t 4 e 6 7	5 4 1 1 6 1 2 6 5 5 1		Alban Berg: Lulu, Chorale	1934	6-Z39	6-Z10	—
I:	0 7 e t 9 3; 4 2 8 1 6 5	5 4 1 1 6 1 2 6 5 5 1		Alban Berg: Lulu, Chorale	1934	6-Z39	6-Z10	—
P:	0 5 1 4 2 3; 9 8 t 7 e 6	5 4 3 2 1 6 1 2 3 4 5		Michael Gielen: Six Songs, for bass, violin, viola, clarinet, bass clarinet, and piano	1958	6–1	6–1	retrograde-symmetrical all-interval row, all- combinatorial hexachords
I:	0 7 e 8 t 9; 3 4 2 5 1 6	5 4 3 2 1 6 1 2 3 4 5		Michael Gielen: Six Songs, for bass, violin, viola, clarinet, bass clarinet, and piano	1958	6–1	6–1	retrograde-symmetrical all-interval row, all- combinatorial hexachords
P:	0 5 1 4 t 8 e 9 3 6 2 7	5 4 3 6 2 3 2 6 3 4 5		Alfred Schnittke: Concerto Grosso No. 3	1985	6–31	6–31	—
I:	0 7 e 8 2 4; 1 3 9 6 t 5	5 4 3 6 2 3 2 6 3 4 5		Alfred Schnittke: Concerto Grosso No. 3	1985	6–31	6–31	—
P:	0 5 2 7 4 9; 6 e 8 1 t 3	5 3 5 3 5 3 5 3 5 3 5		Benjamin Britten: The Turn of the Screw	1954	6–32	6–32	—
I:	0 7 t 5 8 3; 6 1 4 e 2 9	5 3 5 3 5 3 5 3 5 3 5		Benjamin Britten: The Turn of the Screw	1954	6–32	6–32	—
P:	0 5 2 7 t 1 e 4 6 8 9 3	5 3 5 3 3 2 5 2 2 1 6		Dmitri Shostakovich: Symphony No. 14, mov. III	1969	6-Z47	6-Z25	—
I:	0 7 t 5 2 e 1 8 6 4 3 9	5 3 5 3 3 2 5 2 2 1 6		Dmitri Shostakovich: Symphony No. 14, mov. III	1969	6-Z47	6-Z25	—
P:	0 5 2 t 1 7; 8 6 e 4 9 3	5 3 4 3 6 1 2 5 5 5 6		Alban Berg: Lulu, Countess Geschwitz	1934	6-Z47	6-Z25	—
I:	0 7 t 2 e 5; 4 6 1 8 3 9	5 3 4 3 6 1 2 5 5 5 6		Alban Berg: Lulu, Countess Geschwitz	1934	6-Z47	6-Z25	—
P:	0 5 4 7 t 6 e 8 1 9 2 3	5 1 3 3 4 5 3 5 4 5 1		Igor Stravinsky: Threni	1958	6-Z41	6-Z12	—
I:	0 7 8 5 2 6; 1 4 e 3 t 9	5 1 3 3 4 5 3 5 4 5 1		Igor Stravinsky: Threni	1958	6-Z41	6-Z12	—
P:	0 5 7 4 2 3; 9 1 8 e t 6	5 2 3 2 1 6 4 5 3 1 4		Milton Babbitt: Three Compositions for Piano, no. I	1947	6–8	6–8	—
I:	0 7 5 8 t 9; 3 e 4 1 2 6	5 2 3 2 1 6 4 5 3 1 4		Milton Babbitt: Three Compositions for Piano, no. I	1947	6–8	6–8	—
P:	0 5 7 6 e 3; 4 2 9 8 t 1	5 2 1 5 4 1 2 5 1 2 3		Alban Berg: Lulu, Acrobat/Athlete	1934	6-Z17	6-Z43	all-trichord hexachord
I:	0 7 5 6 1 9; 8 t 3 4 2 e	5 2 1 5 4 1 2 5 1 2 3		Alban Berg: Lulu, Acrobat/Athlete	1934	6-Z17	6-Z43	all-trichord hexachord
P:	0 5 9 t 4 7; 6 e 1 2 8 3	5 4 1 6 3 1 5 2 1 6 5		Alban Berg: Lulu, Dr. Schön	1934	6-Z25	6-Z47	—
I:	0 7 3 2 8 5; 6 1 e t 4 9	5 4 1 6 3 1 5 2 1 6 5		Alban Berg: Lulu, Dr. Schön	1934	6-Z25	6-Z47	—
P:	0 5 e 6 3 2; 8 7 9 t 4 1	5 6 5 3 1 6 1 2 1 6 3		Karlheinz Stockhausen: "Leo", from Tierkreis	1974–75	6Z-13	6-Z42	—
I:	0 7 1 6 9 t 4 5 3 2 8 e	5 6 5 3 1 6 1 2 1 6 3		Karlheinz Stockhausen: "Leo", from Tierkreis	1974–75	6Z-13	6-Z42	—
P:	0 6 4 2 8 9; 3 1 e t 7 5	6 2 2 6 1 6 2 2 1 3 2		Igor Stravinsky: Elegy for J.F.K.	1964	6–34	6–34	—
I:	0 6 8 t 4 3; 9 e 1 2 5 7	6 2 2 6 1 6 2 2 1 3 2		Igor Stravinsky: Elegy for J.F.K.	1964	6–34	6–34	—
P:	0 6 4 3 2 9 t 5 7 8 e 1	6 2 1 1 5 1 5 2 1 3 2		Karel Husa: Mosaïques	1960	6-Z45	6-Z23	—
I:	0 6 8 9 t 3; 2 7 5 4 1 e	6 2 1 1 5 1 5 2 1 3 2		Karel Husa: Mosaïques	1960	6-Z45	6-Z23	—
P:	0 6 5 1 e 7; 4 8 9 3 2 t	6 1 4 2 4 3 4 1 6 1 4		Arnold Schoenberg: "De Profundis", Op. 50b	1950	6–7	6–7	—
I:	0 6 7 e 1 5; 8 4 3 9 t 2	6 1 4 2 4 3 4 1 6 1 4		Arnold Schoenberg: "De Profundis", Op. 50b	1950	6–7	6–7	—
P:	0 6 5 2 3 4; 7 8 9 t e 1	6 1 3 1 1 3 1 1 1 1 2		Karlheinz Stockhausen: "Sagittarius", from Tierkreis	1974–75	6–2	6–2	—
I:	0 6 7 t 9 8; 5 4 3 2 1 e	6 1 3 1 1 3 1 1 1 1 2		Karlheinz Stockhausen: "Sagittarius", from Tierkreis	1974–75	6–2	6–2	—
P:	0 6 5 e t 4; 3 9 8 2 1 7	6 1 6 1 6 1 6 1 6 1 6		Witold Lutosławski: Musique funèbre (Funeral Music)	1954–58	6–7	6–7	—
I:	0 6 7 1 2 8; 9 3 4 t e 5	6 1 6 1 6 1 6 1 6 1 6		Witold Lutosławski: Musique funèbre (Funeral Music)	1954–58	6–7	6–7	—
P:	0 6 7 8 9 1; 2 5 e 4 t 3	6 1 1 1 4 1 3 6 5 6 5		Wolfgang Amadeus Mozart: String Quartet in E♭ major, K. 428 first movement, opening of development section		6–5	6–5	—
I:	0 6 5 4 3 e t 7 1 8 2 9	6 1 1 1 4 1 3 6 5 6 5		Wolfgang Amadeus Mozart: String Quartet in E♭ major, K. 428 first movement, opening of development section		6–5	6–5	—
P:	0 6 8 5 7 e 4 3 9 t 1 2	6 2 3 2 4 5 1 6 1 3 1		Arnold Schoenberg: Variations, Op. 31	1926–28	6–5	6–5	Bach motif
I:	0 6 4 7 5 1; 8 9 3 2 e t	6 2 3 2 4 5 1 6 1 3 1		Arnold Schoenberg: Variations, Op. 31	1926–28	6–5	6–5	Bach motif
P:	0 6 8 t 2 4; 9 5 3 e 7 1	6 2 2 4 2 5 4 2 4 4 6		Arnold Schoenberg: Three Songs, Op. 48	1933	6–35	6–35	—
I:	0 6 4 2 t 8; 3 7 9 1 5 e	6 2 2 4 2 5 4 2 4 4 6		Arnold Schoenberg: Three Songs, Op. 48	1933	6–35	6–35	—
P:	0 6 9 2 8 t 4 7 1 e 3 5	6 3 5 6 2 6 3 6 2 4 2		Josef Matthias Hauer: Salambo, op. 60	1929	6-21	6-21	—
I:	0 6 3 t 4 2; 8 5 e 1 9 7	6 3 5 6 2 6 3 6 2 4 2		Josef Matthias Hauer: Salambo, op. 60	1929	6-21	6-21	—
P:	0 6 t 7 9 8; 3 2 4 1 5 e	6 4 3 2 1 5 1 2 3 4 6		Michel Fano: Sonata for Two Pianos	1951	6-Z3	6-Z36	retrograde-symmetry
I:	0 6 2 5 3 4; 9 t 8 e 7 1	6 4 3 2 1 5 1 2 3 4 6		Michel Fano: Sonata for Two Pianos	1951	6-Z3	6-Z36	retrograde-symmetry
P:	0 6 t 8 4 7; 2 5 1 e 3 9	6 4 2 4 3 5 3 4 2 4 6		Ben Johnston: String Quartet No. 7, mov. 2	1984	6–21	6–21	just intonation: otonality & utonality
I:	0 6 2 4 8 5 t 7 e 1 9 3	6 4 2 4 3 5 3 4 2 4 6		Ben Johnston: String Quartet No. 7, mov. 2	1984	6–21	6–21	just intonation: otonality & utonality
P:	0 7 1 t e 9; 5 8 4 3 2 6	5 6 3 1 2 4 3 4 1 1 4		Karlheinz Stockhausen: Klavierstück IV (third row of 48)	1952	6–2	6–2	—
I:	0 5 e 2 1 3; 7 4 8 9 t 6	5 6 3 1 2 4 3 4 1 1 4		Karlheinz Stockhausen: Klavierstück IV (third row of 48)	1952	6–2	6–2	—
P:	0 7 2 1 e 8; 3 5 9 t 4 6	5 5 1 2 3 5 2 4 1 6 2		Arnold Schoenberg: Piano Piece, op. 33a	1928	6–5	6–5	—
I:	0 5 t e 1 4; 9 7 3 2 8 6	5 5 1 2 3 5 2 4 1 6 2		Arnold Schoenberg: Piano Piece, op. 33a	1928	6–5	6–5	—
P:	0 7 3 t 2 6; 9 1 4 8 e 5	5 4 5 4 4 3 4 3 4 3 6		Alberto Ginastera: Quintet, op. 29	1963	6–31	6–31	—
I:	0 5 9 2 t 6; 3 e 8 4 1 7	5 4 5 4 4 3 4 3 4 3 6		Alberto Ginastera: Quintet, op. 29	1963	6–31	6–31	—
P:	0 7 4 e 6 t 3 9 1 8 5 2	5 3 5 5 4 5 6 4 5 3 3		Elliott Carter: Piano Concerto, Orchestra	1964–65	6-Z43	6-Z17	all-trichord hexachord; ordered in register
I:	0 5 8 1 6 2; 9 3 e 4 7 t	5 3 5 5 4 5 6 4 5 3 3		Elliott Carter: Piano Concerto, Orchestra	1964–65	6-Z43	6-Z17	all-trichord hexachord; ordered in register
P:	0 7 6 4 5 9; 8 t 3 1 e 2	5 1 2 1 4 1 2 5 2 2 3		Igor Stravinsky: Requiem Canticles, 2nd series	1966	6-Z40	6-Z11	—
I:	0 5 6 8 7 3; 4 2 9 e 1 t	5 1 2 1 4 1 2 5 2 2 3		Igor Stravinsky: Requiem Canticles, 2nd series	1966	6-Z40	6-Z11	—
P:	0 7 6 e 9 1; 4 t 8 5 2 3	5 1 5 2 4 3 6 2 3 3 1		Ernst Krenek: String Quartet No. 7, op. 96	1943–44	6-Z12	6-Z41	—
I:	0 5 6 1 3 e 8 2 4 7 t 9	5 1 5 2 4 3 6 2 3 3 1		Ernst Krenek: String Quartet No. 7, op. 96	1943–44	6-Z12	6-Z41	—
P:	0 7 e 2 1 9; 3 5 t 6 8 4	5 4 3 1 4 6 2 5 4 2 4		Arnold Schoenberg: Piano Concerto, Op. 42	1942	6–9	6–9	inversional
I:	0 5 1 t e 3; 9 7 2 6 4 8	5 4 3 1 4 6 2 5 4 2 4		Arnold Schoenberg: Piano Concerto, Op. 42	1942	6–9	6–9	inversional
P:	0 7 e 8 2 t 6 9 5 4 1 3	5 4 3 6 4 4 3 4 1 3 2		Anton Webern: Op. 23	1933	6-Z10	6-Z39	—
I:	0 5 1 4 t 2; 6 3 7 8 e 9	5 4 3 6 4 4 3 4 1 3 2		Anton Webern: Op. 23	1933	6-Z10	6-Z39	—
P:	0 7 e t 2 9; 6 1 5 4 8 3	5 4 1 4 5 3 5 4 1 4 5		Ross Lee Finney: Edge of Shadow	1959	6–8	6–8	—
I:	0 5 1 2 t 3; 6 e 7 8 4 9	5 4 1 4 5 3 5 4 1 4 5		Ross Lee Finney: Edge of Shadow	1959	6–8	6–8	—
P:	0 7 e t 9 8; 3 6 4 1 5 2	5 4 1 1 1 5 3 2 3 4 3		Karlheinz Stockhausen: "Cancer", from Tierkreis	1974–75	6–1	6–1	all- combinatorial
I:	0 5 1 2 3 4; 9 6 8 e 7 t	5 4 1 1 1 5 3 2 3 4 3		Karlheinz Stockhausen: "Cancer", from Tierkreis	1974–75	6–1	6–1	all- combinatorial
P:	0 8 1 7 2 e 9 6 4 5 3 t	4 5 6 5 3 2 3 2 1 2 5		Arnold Schoenberg: String Trio, Op. 45	1946	6–5	6–5	—
I:	0 4 e 5 t 1; 3 6 8 7 9 2	4 5 6 5 3 2 3 2 1 2 5		Arnold Schoenberg: String Trio, Op. 45	1946	6–5	6–5	—
P:	0 8 1 t 9 e 5 3 4 7 2 6	4 5 3 1 2 6 2 1 3 5 4		Karlheinz Stockhausen: Klavierstück VII Gruppen; Klavierstück IX; Klavierstück X	1955; 1955–57; 1961; 1961	6–1	6–1	all- combinatorial hexachord, retrograde-symmetrical all-interval
I:	0 4 e 2 3 1; 7 9 8 5 t 6	4 5 3 1 2 6 2 1 3 5 4		Karlheinz Stockhausen: Klavierstück VII Gruppen; Klavierstück IX; Klavierstück X	1955; 1955–57; 1961; 1961	6–1	6–1	all- combinatorial hexachord, retrograde-symmetrical all-interval
P:	0 8 1 e t 7; 5 9 4 6 3 2	4 5 2 1 3 2 4 5 2 3 1		Karlheinz Stockhausen: Klavierstück V (row of original 1954 version); Klavierstück VIII	1954–55; 1954	6-Z3	6-Z36	—
I:	0 4 e 1 2 5; 7 3 8 6 9 t	4 5 2 1 3 2 4 5 2 3 1		Karlheinz Stockhausen: Klavierstück V (row of original 1954 version); Klavierstück VIII	1954–55; 1954	6-Z3	6-Z36	—
P:	0 8 4 9 t 3; 1 6 e 2 7 5	4 4 5 1 5 2 5 5 3 5 2		Elliott Carter: Piano Concerto, Solo[ist]	1964–65	6-Z17	6-Z43	all-interval hexachord; ordered in register
I:	0 4 8 3 2 9 e 6 1 t 5 7	4 4 5 1 5 2 5 5 3 5 2		Elliott Carter: Piano Concerto, Solo[ist]	1964–65	6-Z17	6-Z43	all-interval hexachord; ordered in register
P:	0 8 5 t 7 1; 6 4 e 2 3 9	4 3 5 3 6 5 2 5 3 1 6		Alban Berg: Lulu, Alwa	1934	6-Z25	6-Z47	—
I:	0 4 7 2 5 e 6 8 1 t 9 3	4 3 5 3 6 5 2 5 3 1 6		Alban Berg: Lulu, Alwa	1934	6-Z25	6-Z47	—
P:	0 8 7 t 4 5; 2 9 e 3 1 6	4 1 3 6 1 3 5 2 4 2 5		Elliott Carter: A Symphony of Three Orchestras	1976	6-Z24	6-Z46	ordered in register
I:	0 4 5 2 8 7 t 3 1 9 e 6	4 1 3 6 1 3 5 2 4 2 5		Elliott Carter: A Symphony of Three Orchestras	1976	6-Z24	6-Z46	ordered in register
P:	0 8 7 e t 9; 3 1 4 2 6 5	4 1 4 1 1 6 2 3 2 4 1		Anton Webern: Variations for piano, mov. III, op. 27	1936	6–1	6–1	all- combinatorial
I:	0 4 5 1 2 3; 9 e 8 t 6 7	4 1 4 1 1 6 2 3 2 4 1		Anton Webern: Variations for piano, mov. III, op. 27	1936	6–1	6–1	all- combinatorial
P:	0 8 e t 2 1; 4 3 7 6 9 5	4 3 1 4 1 3 1 4 1 3 4		Anton Webern: Op. 29	1938	6–2	6–2	semi-combinatorial, RI-invariant: P0 = RI5
I:	0 4 1 2 t e 8 9 5 6 3 7	4 3 1 4 1 3 1 4 1 3 4		Anton Webern: Op. 29	1938	6–2	6–2	semi-combinatorial, RI-invariant: P0 = RI5
P:	0 8 e t 4 6; 7 1 5 3 9 2	4 3 1 6 2 1 6 4 2 6 5		Ernst Krenek: Sestina, op. 161	1957	6–22	6–22	—
I:	0 4 1 2 8 6; 5 e 7 9 3 t	4 3 1 6 2 1 6 4 2 6 5		Ernst Krenek: Sestina, op. 161	1957	6–22	6–22	—
P:	0 9 1 3 4 e 2 8 7 5 t 6	3 4 2 1 5 3 6 1 2 5 4		Luigi Dallapiccola: Piccola musica notturna	1954	6–8	6–8	—
I:	0 3 e 9 8 1 t 4 5 7 2 6	3 4 2 1 5 3 6 1 2 5 4		Luigi Dallapiccola: Piccola musica notturna	1954	6–8	6–8	—
P:	0 9 1 8 4 5; 7 2 3 6 t e	3 4 5 4 1 2 5 1 3 4 1		Milton Babbitt: Composition for Synthesizer	1961	6–20	6–20	—
I:	0 3 e 4 8 7; 5 t 9 6 2 1	3 4 5 4 1 2 5 1 3 4 1		Milton Babbitt: Composition for Synthesizer	1961	6–20	6–20	—
P:	0 9 1 e t 2; 8 7 5 4 6 3	3 4 2 1 4 6 1 2 1 2 3		Milton Babbitt: Composition for Four Instruments	1948	6–1	6–1	all- combinatorial
I:	0 3 e 1 2 t 4 5 7 8 6 9	3 4 2 1 4 6 1 2 1 2 3		Milton Babbitt: Composition for Four Instruments	1948	6–1	6–1	all- combinatorial
P:	0 9 2 3 e t 5 4 1 6 7 8	3 5 1 4 1 5 1 3 5 1 1		Igor Stravinsky: Epitaphium	1959	6-Z3	6-Z36	—
I:	0 3 t 9 1 2; 7 8 e 6 5 4	3 5 1 4 1 5 1 3 5 1 1		Igor Stravinsky: Epitaphium	1959	6-Z3	6-Z36	—
P:	0 9 2 8 7 5; 6 1 3 4 t e	3 5 6 1 2 1 5 2 1 6 1		Karlheinz Stockhausen: "Capricorn", from Tierkreis	1974–75	6-Z47	6-Z25	—
I:	0 3 t 4 5 7; 6 e 9 8 2 1	3 5 6 1 2 1 5 2 1 6 1		Karlheinz Stockhausen: "Capricorn", from Tierkreis	1974–75	6-Z47	6-Z25	—
P:	0 9 8 4 7 6; 1 t 3 5 e 2	3 1 4 3 1 5 3 5 2 6 3		David Dzubay: Di/Con[ver(gence/sions)]	1988	6-Z39	6-Z10	—
I:	0 3 4 8 5 6 e 2 9 7 1 t	3 1 4 3 1 5 3 5 2 6 3		David Dzubay: Di/Con[ver(gence/sions)]	1988	6-Z39	6-Z10	—
P:	0 9 8 e t 2; 3 4 5 7 1 6	3 1 3 1 4 1 1 1 2 6 5		Anton Webern: Op. 22	1929–30	6–2	6–2	semi-combinatorial
I:	0 3 4 1 2 t 9 8 7 5 e 6	3 1 3 1 4 1 1 1 2 6 5		Anton Webern: Op. 22	1929–30	6–2	6–2	semi-combinatorial
P:	0 9 e 2 4 1; 7 t 8 5 3 6	3 2 3 2 3 6 3 2 3 2 3		Milton Babbitt: Composition for Four Instruments, row ii	1948	6–8	6–8	—
I:	0 3 1 t 8 e 5 2 4 7 9 6	3 2 3 2 3 6 3 2 3 2 3		Milton Babbitt: Composition for Four Instruments, row ii	1948	6–8	6–8	—
P:	0 t 1 2 5 4; 6 3 7 e 8 9	2 3 1 3 1 2 3 4 4 3 1		Pierre Boulez: Le marteau sans maître	1953–55	6-Z10	6-Z39	—
I:	0 2 e t 7 8; 6 9 5 1 4 3	2 3 1 3 1 2 3 4 4 3 1		Pierre Boulez: Le marteau sans maître	1953–55	6-Z10	6-Z39	—
P:	0 t 3 4 2 7; 6 9 8 e 1 5	2 5 1 2 5 1 3 1 3 2 4		Charles Ives: Tone Roads No. 1	1911	6-Z46	6-Z24	—
I:	0 2 9 8 t 5; 6 3 4 1 e 7	2 5 1 2 5 1 3 1 3 2 4		Charles Ives: Tone Roads No. 1	1911	6-Z46	6-Z24	—
P:	0 t 3 e 8 7; 1 2 5 9 4 6	2 5 4 3 1 6 1 3 4 5 2		Elliott Carter: Night Fantasies	1982	6–14	6–14	—
I:	0 2 9 1 4 5 e t 7 3 8 6	2 5 4 3 1 6 1 3 4 5 2		Elliott Carter: Night Fantasies	1982	6–14	6–14	—
P:	0 t 9 8 7 5 e 1 2 3 4 6	2 1 1 1 2 6 2 1 1 1 2		Milton Babbitt: Composition for Four Instruments, row i	1948	6–8	6–8	—
I:	0 2 3 4 5 7; 1 e t 9 8 6	2 1 1 1 2 6 2 1 1 1 2		Milton Babbitt: Composition for Four Instruments, row i	1948	6–8	6–8	—
P:	0 t 9 e 7 2; 8 1 4 6 5 3	2 1 2 4 5 6 5 3 2 1 2		Karlheinz Stockhausen: Kreuzspiel	1951	6-Z50	6-Z29	—
I:	0 2 3 1 5 t 4 e 8 6 7 9	2 1 2 4 5 6 5 3 2 1 2		Karlheinz Stockhausen: Kreuzspiel	1951	6-Z50	6-Z29	—
P:	0 e 1 2 9 8 t 7 5 6 4 3	1 2 1 5 1 2 3 2 1 2 1		Igor Stravinsky: Agon, "Double Pas de Quatre"	1957	6-Z3	6-Z36	—
I:	0 1 e t 3 4; 2 5 7 6 8 9	1 2 1 5 1 2 3 2 1 2 1		Igor Stravinsky: Agon, "Double Pas de Quatre"	1957	6-Z3	6-Z36	—
P:	0 e 1 3 4 2; 5 7 6 8 t 9	1 2 2 1 2 3 2 1 2 2 1		Igor Stravinsky: Fanfare	1964	6–1	6–1	all- combinatorial
I:	0 1 e 9 8 t 7 5 6 4 2 3	1 2 2 1 2 3 2 1 2 2 1		Igor Stravinsky: Fanfare	1964	6–1	6–1	all- combinatorial
P:	0 e 1 3 4 2; 7 6 9 5 8 t	1 2 2 1 2 5 1 3 4 3 2		Igor Stravinsky: Canticum Sacrum, II & IV	1955	6–1	6–1	all- combinatorial
I:	0 1 e 9 8 t 5 6 3 7 4 2	1 2 2 1 2 5 1 3 4 3 2		Igor Stravinsky: Canticum Sacrum, II & IV	1955	6–1	6–1	all- combinatorial
P:	0 e 1 7 9 8 t 4 6 5 2 3	1 2 6 2 1 2 6 2 1 3 1		Chen Yi: Woodwind Quintet	1987	6-Z4	6-Z37	—
I:	0 1 e 5 3 4; 2 8 6 7 t 9	1 2 6 2 1 2 6 2 1 3 1		Chen Yi: Woodwind Quintet	1987	6-Z4	6-Z37	—
P:	0 e 2 1 3 4; 9 t 7 8 6 5	1 3 1 2 1 5 1 3 1 2 1		Arvo Pärt: Diagrams	1964	6–1	6–1	all- combinatorial
I:	0 1 t e 9 8; 3 2 5 4 6 7	1 3 1 2 1 5 1 3 1 2 1		Arvo Pärt: Diagrams	1964	6–1	6–1	all- combinatorial
P:	0 e 2 1 5 6; 3 4 8 7 t 9	1 3 1 4 1 3 1 4 1 3 1		Anton Webern: String Quartet, Op. 28:	1936	6–5	6–5	derived: 4–1 (BACH motif), semi-combinatorial
I:	0 1 t e 7 6; 9 8 4 5 2 3	1 3 1 4 1 3 1 4 1 3 1		Anton Webern: String Quartet, Op. 28:	1936	6–5	6–5	derived: 4–1 (BACH motif), semi-combinatorial
P:	0 e 2 3 4 1; 6 5 8 9 t 7	1 3 1 1 3 5 1 3 1 1 3		Alberto Ginastera: Violin Concerto, op. 30	1963	6–1	6–1	all- combinatorial
I:	0 1 t 9 8 e 6 7 4 3 2 5	1 3 1 1 3 5 1 3 1 1 3		Alberto Ginastera: Violin Concerto, op. 30	1963	6–1	6–1	all- combinatorial
P:	0 e 2 9 5 3; 4 8 t 7 1 6	1 3 5 4 2 1 4 2 3 6 5		Elliott Carter: String Quartet No. 3	1973	6-Z23	6-Z45	—
I:	0 1 t 3 7 9; 8 4 2 5 e 6	1 3 5 4 2 1 4 2 3 6 5		Elliott Carter: String Quartet No. 3	1973	6-Z23	6-Z45	—
P:	0 e 3 1 7 9; 6 2 t 5 8 4	1 4 2 6 2 3 4 4 5 3 4		Arnold Schoenberg: Violin Phantasy, Op. 47	1949	6–21	6–21	—
I:	0 1 9 e 5 3; 6 t 2 7 4 8	1 4 2 6 2 3 4 4 5 3 4		Arnold Schoenberg: Violin Phantasy, Op. 47	1949	6–21	6–21	—
P:	0 e 3 2 1 8; 6 9 t 7 5 4	1 4 1 1 5 2 3 1 3 2 1		Igor Stravinsky: Double Canon	1959	6-Z36	6-Z3	—
I:	0 1 9 t e 4; 6 3 2 5 7 8	1 4 1 1 5 2 3 1 3 2 1		Igor Stravinsky: Double Canon	1959	6-Z36	6-Z3	—
P:	0 e 3 4 8 7; 9 5 6 1 2 t	1 4 1 4 1 2 4 1 5 1 4		Anton Webern: Concerto for Nine Instruments, Op. 24	1934	6–20	6–20	all- combinatorial, derived: 3–3
I:	0 1 9 8 4 5; 3 7 6 e t 2	1 4 1 4 1 2 4 1 5 1 4		Anton Webern: Concerto for Nine Instruments, Op. 24	1934	6–20	6–20	all- combinatorial, derived: 3–3
P:	0 e 4 5 7 3; 2 6 8 1 t 9	1 5 1 2 4 1 4 2 5 3 1		David Lewin: Just a Minute, Roger	1978	6–16	6–16	—
I:	0 1 8 7 5 9 t 6 4 e 2 3	1 5 1 2 4 1 4 2 5 3 1		David Lewin: Just a Minute, Roger	1978	6–16	6–16	—
P:	0 e 5 2 1 6; 3 8 7 4 t 9	1 6 3 1 5 3 5 1 3 6 1		Alfred Schnittke: Viola Concerto	1985	6–5	6–5	—
I:	0 1 7 t e 6; 9 4 5 8 2 3	1 6 3 1 5 3 5 1 3 6 1		Alfred Schnittke: Viola Concerto	1985	6–5	6–5	—
P:	0 e 5 9 6 2; 7 3 1 4 t 8	1 6 4 3 4 5 4 2 3 6 2		Luigi Dallapiccola: Cinque Canti		6-Z50	6-Z29	RI-invariant: P0 = RI9
I:	0 1 7 3 6 t 5 9 e 8 2 3	1 6 4 3 4 5 4 2 3 6 2		Luigi Dallapiccola: Cinque Canti		6-Z50	6-Z29	RI-invariant: P0 = RI9
P:	0 e 6 5 4 3; 1 t 9 7 2 8	1 5 1 1 1 2 3 1 2 5 6		Pierre Boulez: Structures Ia	1952	6–5	6–5	—
I:	0 1 6 7 8 9 e 2 3 5 t 4	1 5 1 1 1 2 3 1 2 5 6		Pierre Boulez: Structures Ia	1952	6–5	6–5	—
P:	0 e 6 5 7 1; 8 2 t 3 4 9	1 5 1 2 6 5 6 4 5 1 5		George Perle: Three Inventions for Piano, no. 3		6–7	6–7	all- combinatorial
I:	0 1 6 7 5 e 4 t 2 9 8 3	1 5 1 2 6 5 6 4 5 1 5		George Perle: Three Inventions for Piano, no. 3		6–7	6–7	all- combinatorial
P:	0 e 7 1 2 9; 3 8 t 4 5 6	1 4 6 1 5 6 5 2 6 1 1		Alban Berg: Lyric Suite, mov. III	1925–26	6–9	6–9	—
I:	0 1 5 e t 3; 9 4 2 8 7 6	1 4 6 1 5 6 5 2 6 1 1		Alban Berg: Lyric Suite, mov. III	1925–26	6–9	6–9	—
P:	0 e 7 1 4 8; 3 9 t 2 5 6	1 4 6 3 4 5 6 1 4 3 1		Alban Berg: Lyric Suite, mov. VI, row 1	1925–26	6-Z44	6-Z19	—
I:	0 1 5 e 8 4; 9 3 2 t 7 6	1 4 6 3 4 5 6 1 4 3 1		Alban Berg: Lyric Suite, mov. VI, row 1	1925–26	6-Z44	6-Z19	—
P:	0 e 7 4 2 9; 3 8 t 1 5 6	1 4 3 2 5 6 5 2 3 4 1		Fritz Heinrich Klein Alban Berg: Lyric Suite, mov. I Alberto Ginastera: Sonata for Guitar, mvt. III, op. 47	1920–22 1925–26 1976	6–32	6–32	Mother chord (all-interval); Trichordally combinatorial: 0369
I:	0 1 5 8 t 3; 9 4 2 e 7 6	1 4 3 2 5 6 5 2 3 4 1		Fritz Heinrich Klein Alban Berg: Lyric Suite, mov. I Alberto Ginastera: Sonata for Guitar, mvt. III, op. 47	1920–22 1925–26 1976	6–32	6–32	Mother chord (all-interval); Trichordally combinatorial: 0369
P:	0 e 7 8 3 1; 2 t 6 5 4 9	1 4 1 5 2 1 4 4 1 1 5		Arnold Schoenberg: String quartet No. 4	1936	6–16	6–16	—
I:	0 1 5 4 9 e t 2 6 7 8 3	1 4 1 5 2 1 4 4 1 1 5		Arnold Schoenberg: String quartet No. 4	1936	6–16	6–16	—
P:	0 e 8 4 7 3; 1 5 2 6 9 t	1 3 4 3 4 2 4 3 4 3 1		Arnold Schoenberg: Modern Psalm, Op. 50c	1950	6–20	6–20	—
I:	0 1 4 8 5 9 e 7 t 6 3 2	1 3 4 3 4 2 4 3 4 3 1		Arnold Schoenberg: Modern Psalm, Op. 50c	1950	6–20	6–20	—
P:	0 e 8 9 7 6; 1 5 4 3 2 t	1 3 1 2 1 5 4 1 1 1 4		Alban Berg: Lyric Suite, row 2	1925–26	6-Z3	6-Z36	—
I:	0 1 4 3 5 6 e 7 8 9 t 2	1 3 1 2 1 5 4 1 1 1 4		Alban Berg: Lyric Suite, row 2	1925–26	6-Z3	6-Z36	—
P:	0 e 9 2 t 7; 1 4 8 3 5 6	1 2 5 4 3 6 3 4 5 2 1		Milton Babbitt: "The Widow's Lament in Springtime"	1951	6–8	6–8	—
I:	0 1 3 t 2 5 e 8 4 9 7 6	1 2 5 4 3 6 3 4 5 2 1		Milton Babbitt: "The Widow's Lament in Springtime"	1951	6–8	6–8	—
P:	0 e 9 4 3 t 8 7 5 6 1 2	1 2 5 1 5 2 1 2 1 5 1		Dmitri Shostakovich: Symphony No. 14, mov. I	1969	6–5	6–5	—
I:	0 1 3 8 9 2; 4 5 7 6 e t	1 2 5 1 5 2 1 2 1 5 1		Dmitri Shostakovich: Symphony No. 14, mov. I	1969	6–5	6–5	—
P:	0 e 9 6 t 8; 7 5 2 4 3 1	1 2 3 4 2 1 2 3 2 1 2		Igor Stravinsky: Canticum Sacrum, II	1955	6–2	6–2	—
I:	0 1 3 6 2 4; 5 7 t 8 9 e	1 2 3 4 2 1 2 3 2 1 2		Igor Stravinsky: Canticum Sacrum, II	1955	6–2	6–2	—
P:	0 e t 1 3 2; 4 9 8 6 5 7	1 1 3 2 1 2 5 1 2 1 2		Alfred Schnittke: String Quartet No. 4, Mov. I	1989	6–1	6–1	all-combinatorial
I:	0 1 2 e 9 t 8 3 4 6 7 5	1 1 3 2 1 2 5 1 2 1 2		Alfred Schnittke: String Quartet No. 4, Mov. I	1989	6–1	6–1	all-combinatorial
P:	0 e t 5 6 9; 7 1 2 8 3 4	1 1 5 1 3 2 6 1 6 5 1		Arvo Pärt: Symphony No. 1 Perpetuum Mobile	1963; 1963	6–5	6–5	—
I:	0 1 2 7 6 3; 5 e t 4 9 8	1 1 5 1 3 2 6 1 6 5 1		Arvo Pärt: Symphony No. 1 Perpetuum Mobile	1963; 1963	6–5	6–5	—

== Other lengths ==
=== Fewer than twelve ===
Five

Prime form	Interval classes	Notation	Composer: Composition	Year	Set(s)	Features
0 e 8 9 t	1 3 1 1		Igor Stravinsky: In memoriam Dylan Thomas	1954	5–1	—

Six

Prime form	Interval classes	Notation	Composer: Composition	Year	Set(s)	Features
0 6 9 8 1 e	6 3 1 5 2	Sacher hexachord	Pierre Boulez: Messagesquisse Répons Dérive 1 Incises sur Incises	1976 1984 1984 1994 1996	6-Z11, (6-Z40)	Musical cryptogram: Paul Sacher
0 6 9 8 1 e	6 3 1 5 2	Sacher hexachord	Conrad Beck: Für Paul Sacher: Drei Epigramme für Violoncello solo	1976	6-Z11, (6-Z40)	Musical cryptogram: Paul Sacher
0 6 9 8 1 e	6 3 1 5 2	Sacher hexachord	Luciano Berio: Les Mots sont allés	1976	6-Z11, (6-Z40)	Musical cryptogram: Paul Sacher
0 6 9 8 1 e	6 3 1 5 2	Sacher hexachord	Benjamin Britten: Tema "Sacher"	1976	6-Z11, (6-Z40)	Musical cryptogram: Paul Sacher
0 6 9 8 1 e	6 3 1 5 2	Sacher hexachord	Henri Dutilleux: Trois Strophes sur le nom de Sacher	1976	6-Z11, (6-Z40)	Musical cryptogram: Paul Sacher
0 6 9 8 1 e	6 3 1 5 2	Sacher hexachord	Wolfgang Fortner: Zum Spielen für den 70. Geburtstag: Thema und Variationen für Violoncello Solo	1976	6-Z11, (6-Z40)	Musical cryptogram: Paul Sacher
0 6 9 8 1 e	6 3 1 5 2	Sacher hexachord	Alberto Ginastera :Puneña n° 2, op. 45	1976	6-Z11, (6-Z40)	Musical cryptogram: Paul Sacher
0 6 9 8 1 e	6 3 1 5 2	Sacher hexachord	Cristóbal Halffter: Variationen über das Thema eSACHERe	1976	6-Z11, (6-Z40)	Musical cryptogram: Paul Sacher
0 6 9 8 1 e	6 3 1 5 2	Sacher hexachord	Hans Werner Henze: Capriccio per Paul Sacher	1976	6-Z11, (6-Z40)	Musical cryptogram: Paul Sacher
0 6 9 8 1 e	6 3 1 5 2	Sacher hexachord	Heinz Holliger: Chaconne, für Violoncello Solo	1976	6-Z11, (6-Z40)	Musical cryptogram: Paul Sacher
0 6 9 8 1 e	6 3 1 5 2	Sacher hexachord	Klaus Huber: Transpositio ad infinitum	1976	6-Z11, (6-Z40)	Musical cryptogram: Paul Sacher
0 6 9 8 1 e	6 3 1 5 2	Sacher hexachord	Witold Lutosławski: Sacher-Variationen	1976	6-Z11, (6-Z40)	Musical cryptogram: Paul Sacher
0 9 8 7 1 4	3 1 1 6 3		Arnold Schoenberg: Die glückliche Hand, Op. 18 "Seraphita", op. 22, no. 1	1910–13 1913–16	6-Z44 (6-Z19)	Schoenberg hexachord

Eight

Prime form	Interval classes	Notation	Composer: Composition	Year	Set(s)	Features
0 2 8 9 t 4 3 e	2 6 1 1 6 1 4		Alban Berg: Lyric Suite	1925–26	8–5	—
0 2 9 7 t 8 e 1	2 5 2 3 2 3 2		Joonas Kokkonen: Symphonic Sketches, mov. 3, row B	1968	8–1	—
0 7 1 6; 8 2 3 4	5 6 5 2 6 1 1		Alban Berg: Lyric Suite	1925–26	8–5	—
0 8 2 3 t 4 9 e	4 6 1 5 6 5 2		Alban Berg: Lyric Suite	1925–26	8–5	—
0 t 2 4; 5 7 3 1	2 4 2 1 2 4 2		Igor Stravinsky: Agon, "Pas-de-Deux" refrain (b. 463–472)	1957	8–10	—
0 t 3 5; 2 4 1 e	2 5 2 3 2 3 2		Joonas Kokkonen: Symphonic Sketches, mov. 3, row C	1968	8–1	—

Nine

Prime form	Interval classes	Notation	Composer: Composition	Year	Set(s)	Features
0 2 e 4 9; 7 8 6 1	2 3 5 5 2 1 2 5		Joonas Kokkonen: Symphonic Sketches, mov. 3, row D	1968	9–8	—

Ten

Prime form	Interval classes	Notation	Composer: Composition	Year	Set(s)	Features
0 e 2 1 5; 6 4 9 7 8	1 3 1 4 1 2 5 2 1		Arvo Pärt: Collage sur B-A-C-H	1964	—	BACH motif

Eleven

Prime form	Interval classes	Notation	Composer: Composition	Year	Set(s)	Features
0 1 e 5 6 8; 7 9 2 3 4	1 2 6 1 2 1 2 5 1 1		Karel Husa: Music for Prague 1968	1968	—	—
0 4 3 e 2 7; 6 8 t 5 1	4 1 4 3 5 1 2 2 5 4	Spacing, orchestration not shown	Aaron Copland: Inscape row 1	1967	—	—
0 7 3 9 2 4; 6 t 7 e 1	5 4 6 5 2 2 4 3 4 2		Aaron Copland: Inscape row 2	1967	—	—
0 e t 4 6 2; 1 9 8 5 3	1 1 6 2 4 1 4 1 3 2		Karlheinz Stockhausen: Licht, Lucifer formula	1977– 2003	—	—

=== More than twelve ===
Thirteen

Prime form	Interval classes	Notation	Composer: Composition	Year	Set(s)	Features
0 1 4 5 t 8 7 t e 6 3 2 9	1 3 1 5 2 1; 3 1 5 3 1 7		Karlheinz Stockhausen: "Taurus", from Tierkreis	1974–75	—	—
0 1 t 6 8 3 5; 2 4 e 9 7 0	1 3 4 2 5 2; 3 2 5 2 1 5		Karlheinz Stockhausen: Choral	1950	—	—
0 2 e 7 8 5 t 6 4 3 1 9 0	2 3 4 1 3 5; 4 2 1 2 4 3		Karlheinz Stockhausen: Mantra	1970	—	—
0 3 e 8 5 4; 9 2 1 t 7 3 6	3 4 3 3 1 5; 5 1 3 3 4 3		Luciano Berio: Nones	1953–54	—	—
0 4 1 5 7 t 2; 8 e 9 3 6 9	4 3 4 2 3 4; 6 3 2 6 3 3		Karlheinz Stockhausen: "Pisces", from Tierkreis	1974–75	—	—
0 7 8 6 e t 2; 5 1 3 9 4 0	5 1 2 5 1 4; 3 4 2 6 5 4		Karlheinz Stockhausen: Licht, Michael formula	1977– 2003	—	—
0 e 2 4 t 9; 7 3 7 1 8 5 6	1 3 2 6 1 2; 4 4 6 7 3 1		Karlheinz Stockhausen: "Virgo", from Tierkreis	1974–75	—	—
0 e 4 t 9 5; 8 6 2 1 6 7 3	1 5 6 1 4 3; 2 4 1 5 1 4		Karlheinz Stockhausen: Klavierstück IV (first row of 48)	1952	6-Z38, 6-Z6	—

Fourteen

Prime form	Interval classes	Notation	Composer: Composition	Year	Set(s)	Features
0 1 t 3 9 4 6; 7 4 5 7 3 8 e	1 3 5 6 5 2 1 3 1 2 4 5 3		Karlheinz Stockhausen: "Libra", from Tierkreis	1974–75	—	—
0 1 t 9 2 8 e 7 3 5 6 4 0 2	1 3 1 5 6 3 4 4 2 1 2 4 2		Karlheinz Stockhausen: Inori	1973–74	—	—
0 e 2 4 1 8 t e 9 4 7 5 3 6	1 3 2 3 5 2 1 2 5 3 2 3		Joonas Kokkonen: Cello Concerto, mov. 3, row A	1969	—	—

Seventeen

Prime form	Interval classes	Notation	Composer: Composition	Year	Set(s)	Features
0 2 1 e t 8; 9 e t 0 1 e t 0 e 9 0	2 1 2 1 2 1 2 1; 2 1 2 1 2 1 2 3		Igor Stravinsky: Agon, b. 104	1957	—	—
0 2 3 5 4 9; 7 8 e 1 6 e t 0 e 9 0	2 1 2 1 5 2 1 3; 2 5 5 1 2 1 2 3		Igor Stravinsky: Agon, "Bransles"	1957	6-Z40, 6-Z11	—

Twenty-two

Prime form	Interval classes	Notation	Composer: Composition	Year	Set(s)	Features
0 e 6 8 7; 2 1 3 t 9 4; 6 9 7 8 3; 1 2 4 e t 0	1 5 2 1 5 1; 2 5 1 5 2; 3 2 1 5 2; 1 2 5 1 2		Joonas Kokkonen: Cello Concerto, mov. 3, row B	1969	—	—

Twenty-four

Prime form	Interval classes	Notation	Composer: Composition	Year	Set(s)	Features
0 1 12 14 23 22; 19 18 20 21 3 4; 16 13 6 15 8 7; 17 10 9 11 2 5	0.5 5.5 1 4.5 0.5 1.5 0.5 1 0.5 9 0.5 6 1.5 3.5 4.5 3.5 .5 5 3.5 0.5 5 3.5 0.5 1 4.5 1.5		Pierre Boulez: Polyphonie X, quarter-tone series	1950–51	—	—
0 20 1 10 9 11; 17 15 16 7 2 6; 23 21 22 13 8 12; 18 14 19 4 3 5	10 9.5 4.5 0.5 1 3 1 0.5 4.5 2.5 2 8.5 1 0.5 4.5 2.5 2 3 2 2.5 7.5 0.5 1		Karlheinz Stockhausen: Himmelfahrt, mod24 (no octave equivalency)	2004– 2005	—	—

== See also ==
- Aggregate
- Atonality
- Complementation
- Distance model
- List of dodecaphonic and serial compositions
- Serialism
- Twelve-tone technique
