= All-interval =

All-interval may refer to:

- All-interval hexachord
- All-interval tetrachord
- All-interval twelve-tone row
