= Z19 =

Z19 may refer to:

- 6-Z19, known as the Schoenberg hexachord (012569), containing the pitches [A], Es, C, H, B, E, G (A. Schoenberg), E♭, B, and B♭ being Es, H, and B in German
- German destroyer Z19 Hermann Künne, Type 1936-class destroyer built for the Kriegsmarine in the late 1930s
- Harbin Z-19, also called WZ-19, is a Chinese reconnaissance/attack helicopter developed by Harbin Aircraft Manufacturing Corporation (HAMC)
- New South Wales Z19 class locomotive (formally A.93 class), a class of steam locomotive built for and operated by the New South Wales Government Railways of Australia
