= All Set (Babbitt) =

Music composition

All Set, for jazz ensemble, is a 1957 composition for small jazz band by the American composer Milton Babbitt.

== History ==
All Set was commissioned by the 1957 Brandeis University Creative Arts Festival, which in that year was a jazz festival. It was premiered there by the Bill Evans Orchestra in a performance that was recorded and released on a Columbia Records LP in 1963. The title is a play on words referring to the all-combinatorial twelve-tone series Babbitt used in composing the work. The published score is dedicated to Gunther Schuller.

== Analysis ==
The composition is scored for alto saxophone, tenor saxophone, trumpet, trombone, contrabass, piano, vibraphone, and percussion (trap set: small and large tom-toms, snare drum, bass drum, hi-hat, three suspended cymbals).

The lyrical, imagist tendencies of Babbitt's earlier vocal works are also evident in All Set, which combines a twelve-tone pitch structure using an all-combinatorial set (hence the work's title) to what Babbitt calls "jazz-like properties ... the use of percussion, the Chicago jazz-like juxtapositions of solos and ensembles recalling certain characteristics of group improvisation". Through this fusion of the sounds and rhythms of the jazz ensemble with strict serialism, Babbitt demonstrates the flexibility of his procedures.

The composition falls into three main sections, starting in bars 1, 169, and 270, and concludes with a coda of eighteen bars. Each of the three sections is announced by a prominent statement of the combinatorial pitch array used as the basis of the work, and each section is subdivided into two parts.

As with most of Babbitt's music, pitches are organized according to an array, rather than to a single, referential twelve-tone row. In the opening eight measures, for example, four row forms occur simultaneously:

All Set (Initial pitch array)
P_{0}	C	E	F	B	F♯	B♭	G	E♭	D♭	D	A	A♭
I_{7}	G	E♭	D	A♭	D♭	A	C	E	F♯	F	B♭	B
R_{0}	A♭	A	D	D♭	E♭	G	B♭	F♯	B	F	E	C
RI_{7}	B	B♭	F	F♯	E	C	A	D♭	A♭	D	E♭	G

It is entirely arbitrary which of the four lines of the array is to be regarded as the untransposed prime form (P_{0}). In this case, that designation is assigned to the line presented in the score by the trumpet and trombone, but another source chooses the third line, which is presented in the high register of the vibraphone and the left hand of the piano. Regardless of which row is used as a reference, all of the hexachords are drawn from the (unordered) second-order all-combinatorial hexachord, type [0,1,2,6,7,8], which is Babbitt's "source set" number 4.

It was in this work, together with Partitions for piano, that Babbitt introduced his idea of time points as an analogue to the twelve chromatic pitch classes. There is no steady beat from either the trap set or bass (as might be expected in a jazz piece), so that the effect produced is one of persistent and rather nervous activity (consistent with the tonal material), with only occasional relief.

== Recordings ==
- Outstanding Jazz Compositions of the 20th Century. J. J. Johnson: Jazz Suite for Brass; John Lewis: Three Little Feelings; Jimmy Giuffre: Pharaoh; George Russell: All about Rosie; Teo Macero: Sounds of May; Bob Prince: Avakianas Brasileiras; Teddy Charles: Swinging Goatsherd Blues; Charles Mingus: Revelations (first movement); Jimmy Giuffre: Suspensions; Harold Shapero: On Green Mountain: Chaconne after Monteverdi; Duke Ellington: Idiom '59; Milton Babbitt: All Set; Gunther Schuller: Transformation. Performed by various ensembles. [Babbitt performed by Bill Evans and orchestra]. Recorded 1955–1959. LP recording, 2 discs: 33 1/3 rpm, electronically re-channeled for stereo, 12 in (300 mm) Columbia C25 831 (CS 8909, CS 8910). New York: Columbia Records, 1963. Reissued on Bill Evans and Orchestra. George Russell: All about Rosie: part I & part II; Jimmy Giuffre: Suspensions; Gunther Schuller: Transformation; Harold Shapero: On Green Mountain; Milton Babbitt: All Set; Charles Mingus: Revelations; Howard Dietz and Arthur Schwartz: "Dancing in the Dark"; Cole Porter: "I Love You"; George Gershwin: "'Swonderful". Recorded at the Brandeis Jazz Festival, New York City, 1957, and the Newport Jazz Festival, 1957. Compact disc, 1 sound disc: digital; 4 3/4 in (120 mm) Gambit Records 69214; [S.l.]: Gambit Records, 2005.
- Spectrum New American Music, volume 5. Milton Babbitt: All Set; T. J. Anderson: Variations on a Theme by M. B. Tolson; Richard Wernick: Kaddish-Requiem. Contemporary Chamber Ensemble; Arthur Weisberg, conductor. LP recording, 1 disc: 33 1/3 rpm, stereo, 12 in (300 mm) Nonesuch H-71303. New York: Elektra Nonesuch, 1974. Reissued on CD, Spectrum New American Music, coupled with Stefan Wolpe: Quartet for trumpet, tenor saxophone, percussion, piano; Seymour Shifrin: Satires of Circumstance; George Rochberg: Serenata d'estate; Richard Wernick: Kaddish-Requiem. Elektra Nonesuch 9 79222-2. New York: Elektra Nonesuch, 1990.
- Milton Babbitt: All Set. Composition for Twelve Instruments; All Set; Correspondences; Paraphrases; The Crowded Air; From the Psalter. Boston Modern Orchestra Project; Gil Rose, conductor. BMOP/sound 1034. Malden, MA: BMOP/sound, 2013.

== Listening ==
- All Set, for Jazz Ensemble on the Slowly Expanding Milton Babbitt Album(since 2018), produced by Erik Carlson
