= Diatonic hexachord =

Chord

Component intervals from root
- major sixth
- perfect fifth
- perfect fourth
- major third
- major second
- root

Forte no. / Complement
- 6-32 / 6-32

Interval vector
- <1,4,3,2,5,0>

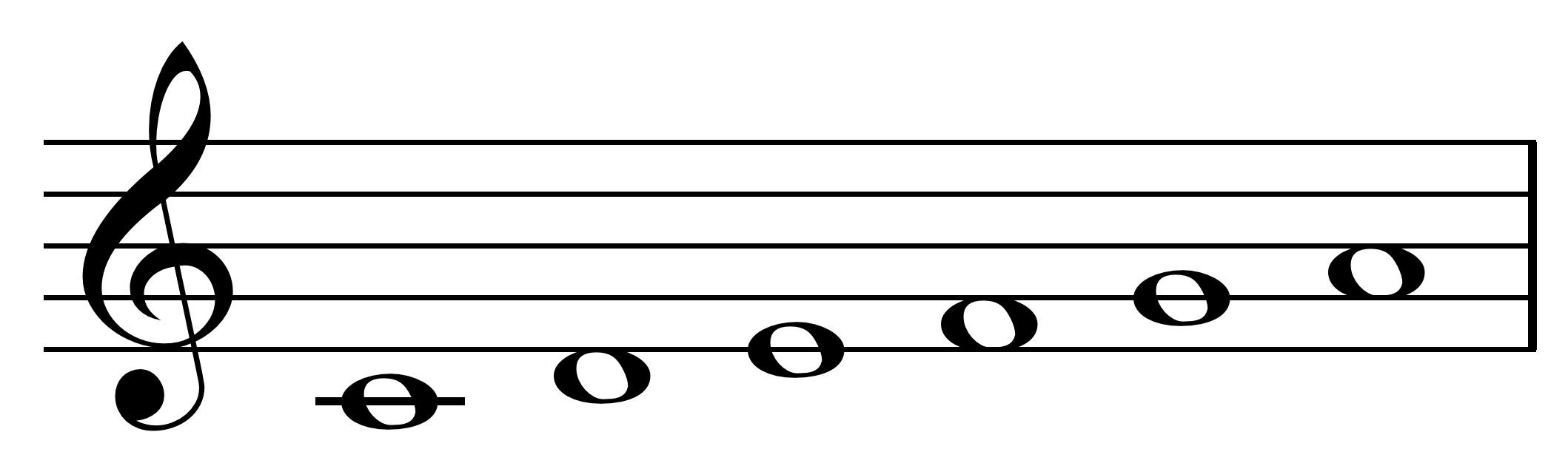
On C

William Daman (ca.1540-1591) - Ut Re Mi Fa Sol La à3 from XX konincklycke fantasien. Mathysz press, Amsterdam (1648)

Alfonso Ferrabosco the Elder (1543-1588) - Ut re mi fa sol la à3 from John Baldwyne’s Commonplace Book, London. GB-Lbl, R.M.24.d.2 (ca.1590-1606)

Alfonso Ferrabosco the Younger (ca.1575-1628) - Fantasia 'On the Hexachord' à4, VdGS No.10 - The Hexachord Ascending, Oxford. Christ College, Mus.Ms.436 (ca.1630)
Hexachord Fantasias performed by Phillip W. Serna, Treble, Tenor & Bass Viols

The diatonic, Guidonian, or major hexachord (6-32) is a hexachord consisting of six consecutive pitches from the diatonic scale that are also a consecutive segment of the circle of fifths: F C G D A E = C D E F G A = "do-re-mi-fa-sol-la".

It is the thirty-second hexachord as ordered by Forte number, and its complement is the diatonic hexachord at the tritone. If the circle of fifths transformation is applied to the diatonic hexachord the chromatic hexachord results. It is source set C.

Hugo Riemann points out that the hexachord consists of three overlapping (diatonic) tetrachords: Lydian, Phrygian, and Dorian; as well as two overlapping pentatonic scales (which are major pentatonic and mixolydian pentatonic). Richard Crocker made the case that, in the words of Stefano Mengozzi, "the Guidonian hexachord was the most important diatonic unit for practical musicians from the Carolingian era to the seventeenth century".

More generally diatonic hexachord may refer to any hexachordal subset of the diatonic septad (7-35): 6-Z25, 6-Z26, 6-32, or 6-33. The minor hexachord is 6-33 (0 2 3 5 7 9 = C D E♭ F G A).

== See also ==
- Guidonian hand
