= All-trichord hexachord =

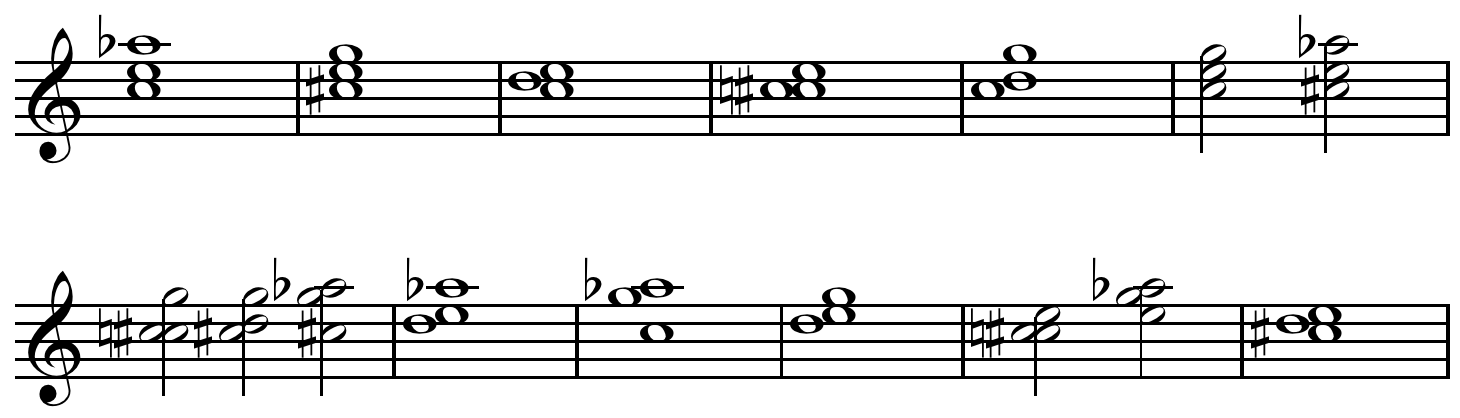
All-trichord hexachord trichords.

In music, the all-trichord hexachord is a unique hexachord that contains all twelve trichords, or from which all twelve possible trichords may be derived. The prime form of this set class is {012478} and its Forte number is 6-Z17. The following is an example of the all-trichord hexachord.

Its complement is 6-Z43 and they share the interval vector of <3,2,2,3,3,2>.

It appears in pieces by Robert Morris and Elliott Carter. Carter uses all-interval twelve-tone sets consisting of all-trichord hexachords in his Symphonia: sum fluxae pretium spei. In 1992, composer and Carter scholar John Link generated a list of every all-interval twelve-tone row from which an all-trichord hexachord could be derived, and offered it to Carter to help with his work.

== See also ==
- All-combinatorial hexachord
- All-interval tetrachord
- All-interval twelve-tone row
