= Il canto sospeso =

Cantata by Luigi Nono

- Cantata by Luigi Nono
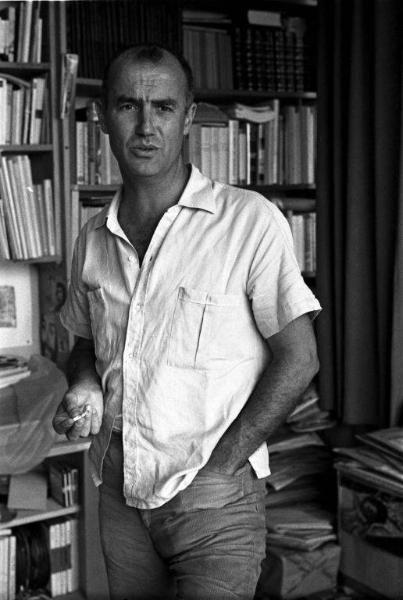
- The composer in 1968
- English: The Suspended Song
- Text: from Giulio Einaudi's Lettere di condannati a morte della Resistenza europea
- Language: Italian
- Performed: 24 October 1956
- Scoring: soprano; alto; tenor; choir; orchestra

Il canto sospeso (The Suspended Song) is a cantata for vocal soloists, choir, and orchestra by the Italian composer Luigi Nono, written in 1955–56. It is one of the most admired examples of serial composition from the 1950s, but has also excited controversy over the relationship between its political content and its compositional means.

== History ==
The title Il canto sospeso may be literally translated as "The Suspended Song", though the word sospeso may also be rendered as "floating" or "interrupted". The title is actually taken from the Italian edition of a poem, "If We Die", by Ethel Rosenberg who, together with her husband Julius, was tried and convicted in the United States of espionage and of passing nuclear secrets to the Soviet Union. Their execution on 19 June 1953 caused outrage in Europe. The phrase in the English original is "the song unsung".

Nono chose his texts from an anthology published in 1954 by Giulio Einaudi as Lettere di condannati a morte della Resistenza europea, a collection of farewell letters written to loved ones by captured European resistance fighters shortly before their executions by the Nazis. The score is dedicated "a tutti loro" (to all of them). The premiere was given under the direction of Hermann Scherchen in Cologne on 24 October 1956. Four years later, it was performed at the twenty-third Festival of Contemporary Music of the Venice Biennale under the direction of Bruno Maderna. This Venice performance was recorded for the radio on 17 September 1960 and in 1988, nearly three decades later, became the first commercially released recording of Il canto sospeso.

Four years after completing the work, Nono incorporated its entire fourth movement into his opera Intolleranza 1960.

== Scoring ==
Il canto sospeso is set for solo soprano, alto, and tenor voices, mixed choir, and an orchestra consisting of:

Woodwinds:

4 flutes
2 oboes
3 clarinets
2 bassoons

Brass:

6 horns
5 trumpets
4 trombones

Percussion:

3 timpani

5 snare drums
5 suspended cymbals
glockenspiel
12 bells
marimbaphone
vibraphone
xylophone

2 harps

celesta

Strings:

first violins
second violins
violas
cellos
double basses

== Analysis ==
All-interval "wedge" series used in Il canto sospeso

The work is divided into nine movements with changing forces:

1. orchestra alone
2. choir alone
3. soprano, alto, and tenor soli, with orchestra
4. orchestra alone
5. tenor solo and orchestra
6. choir and orchestra
7. soprano solo and choir
8. orchestra alone
9. choir and timpani

The movements are grouped into three large segments of four, three, and two movements, marked by a short pause between groups.

In its alternation of instrumental, choral, and solo movements, as well as in some internal details, Il canto sospeso resembles a Baroque cantata or mass setting. Although it is in no way a neoclassical composition, the Darmstadt ideology to which Nono subscribed at the time shared with neoclassical aesthetics a commitment to the notions of purity, order, and objectivity. Nono himself referred to the work as a "cantata".

For its pitch material, Il canto sospeso employs an all-interval twelve-tone row sometimes called the "wedge" series because of its presentation of all the intervals within the octave in expanding order. It is a symmetrical series, whose retrograde is identical to the prime form transposed by a tritone.)

== Reception ==
Il canto sospeso is regarded today as a "serial masterpiece", and is admired for the variety of ideas achieved with the compositional technique of serialism, while at the same time the work's expressive content is considered to be unsurpassed by Nono's subsequent works.

Although the premiere under Hermann Scherchen's baton in Cologne on 24 October 1956 was a success, the direct reference to Nazi crimes was bound to be controversial at a time when such things were not generally spoken of in Germany. Herbert Eimert, reviewing the concert (on which it appeared in the company of Anton Webern's opp. 6 and 10 orchestral pieces and Arnold Schoenberg's Friede auf Erden), declared that Il canto sospeso "probably left the most significant impression to date of any concert work of the young generation of composers today. ... This one work would be enough to legitimize the enigmatic 'legacy of Webern' once and for all".

The choice of texts, however, provoked protracted dissension over the appropriateness of Nono's compositional means to its political content, particularly in the context of Theodor Adorno's recently published "Das Altern der neuen Musik", which associated integral serialism with totalitarian regimes, and his famous phrase, "to write poetry after Auschwitz is barbaric". Sides in the debate were largely along national lines, between West Germany and Italy. Heinz-Klaus Metzger attacked Nono as "a serial Pfitzner" who exploited such texts "in order to present them at the next important festival to the applause of a delighted bourgeoisie", while Massimo Mila defended Nono against Metzger's attack.

In at least one case opposition to Nono's composition went beyond words. A terror bombing at the Munich Oktoberfest on 26 September 1980 killed 13 people and injured more than 200 others. It is believed to have been directed at the scheduled performance of Il canto sospeso, which was cancelled as a result. The political message of the work, rather than its use of integral serialism, is presumed to have been the provocation for the attack.

Though largely overshadowed by the political debate, various aspects of the composition have attracted a steady stream of analysts.

== Recordings ==
- La nuova musica: volume 1. Arnold Schoenberg: La vocazione di Mosè [Moses und Aron, act 1 scene 1]. Luigi Nono: Il canto sospeso. Bruno Maderna: Hyperion. Sinfonieorchester und Chor der Norddeutscher Rundfunk Hamburg, cond. Hans Rosbaud (Schoenberg, recorded in Hamburg on 12 March 1954).
- Ilse Hollweg, soprano; Eva Bornemann, alto; Friedrich Lenz, tenor; Kölner Rundfunkchor and Orchestra of WDR Cologne (Bernhard Zimmermann, chorus master), cond. Bruno Maderna (Nono, recorded in Venice on 17 September 1960).
- Severino Gazzelloni, flute; Dorothy Dorow, soprano; Choro ed Orchestra della Radio Audizioni Italia di Roma, cond. Bruno Maderna (Maderna, recorded in Rome on 8 January 1966). CD recording. Stradivarius STR 10008. [N.p.]: FSM, 1988.
- Luigi Nono: Il canto sospeso. Gustav Mahler: Kindertotenlieder; Rückert-Lieder [No. 3 only]. Barbara Bonney, soprano; Susanne Otto, alto; Marek Torzewski, tenor; Susanne Lothar and Bruno Ganz, speakers; Rundfunkchor Berlin (Dietrich Knothe, chorus master) (Nono). Marjana Lipovšek, mezzo-soprano (Mahler). Berlin Philharmonic, cond. Claudio Abbado. Recorded in the Philharmonie, Berlin, 9–11 December 1992 (Nono) and 3 & 4 September 1992 (Mahler). CD recording. Sony Classical SK 53360. Austria: Sony Classical, 1993.
- Luigi Nono, Il canto sospeso. CD 9 of Anthology of the Royal Concertgebouw Orchestra Volume 3: Live, the Radio Recordings 1960–1970. Ilse Hollweg, soprano; Sophia van Sante, mezzo-soprano; Friedrich Lenz, tenor; members of the Radio Netherlands Choir; Royal Concertgebouw Orchestra, cond. Pierre Boulez. 14-CD set. Radio Netherlands Music RCO 05001. Hilversum: Radio Netherlands Music, 2002.
