= All-interval twelve-tone row =

Musical tone series

All-interval row from Alban Berg's Lyric Suite

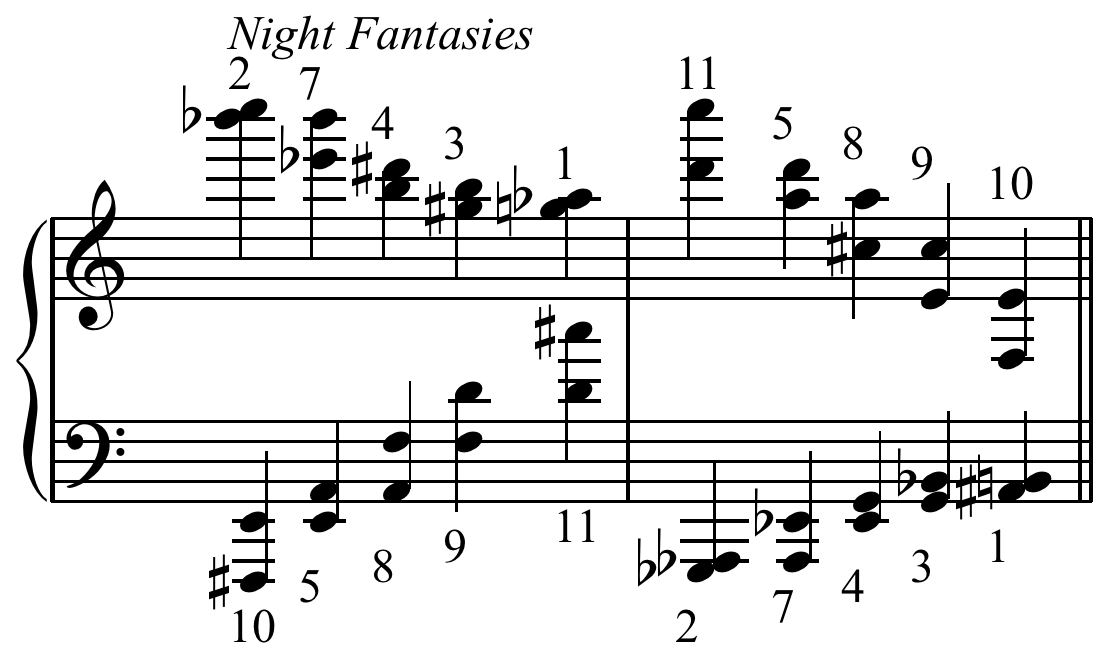
Elliott Carter often based his all-interval sets on the list generated by Bauer-Mendelberg and Ferentz and uses them as a "tonic" sonority

All-interval series from Luigi Nono's Il canto sospeso (Equivalent to Nicolas Slonimsky's "Grandmother Chord".)

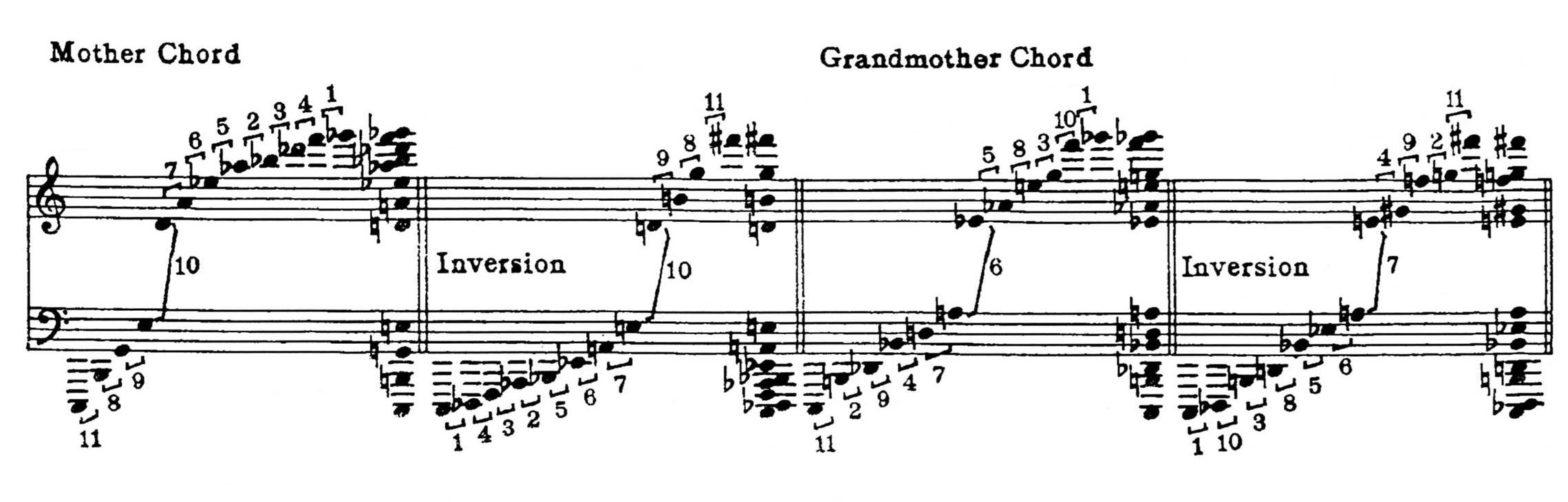

In music, an all-interval twelve-tone row, series, or chord, is a twelve-tone tone row arranged so that it contains one instance of each interval within the octave, 1 through 11 (an ordering of every interval, 0 through 11, that contains each (ordered) pitch-interval class, 0 through 11). A "twelve-note spatial set made up of the eleven intervals [between consecutive pitches]."

There are various ways to count all-interval twelve-tone rows, depending upon one's notion of equivalence. Of the 479,001,600 twelve-tone rows total, 46,272 are all-interval. Counting up to transposition, or equivalently, setting the first pitch class equals 0, brings the number down to 3856. Taking inversion as an equivalence, essentially making the second pitch class 1,2,3,4, or 5, cuts that in half, to 1,928. Retrograde inversion sets the list of intervals running backwards and therefore cannot leave any all-interval row invariant, but the P0 and R6 of an all interval row can coincide - and do for 88 of the 1,928. So there are 1,008 all-interval row types in the sense of Schoenberg's twelve-tone system.

Going beyond Schoenberg can involve multiplication operators or rotations that split the row at the internal tritone (since the sum of numbers 1 through 11 equals 66, an all-interval row must contain a tritone between its first and last notes, as well as in their middle), and each of these operations approximately halve the count. These sets may be ordered in time or in register. The 1,928 tone rows have been independently rediscovered several times, their first computation probably was by Andre Riotte in 1961.

== Examples ==
=== Mother chord ===
Pyramid chord

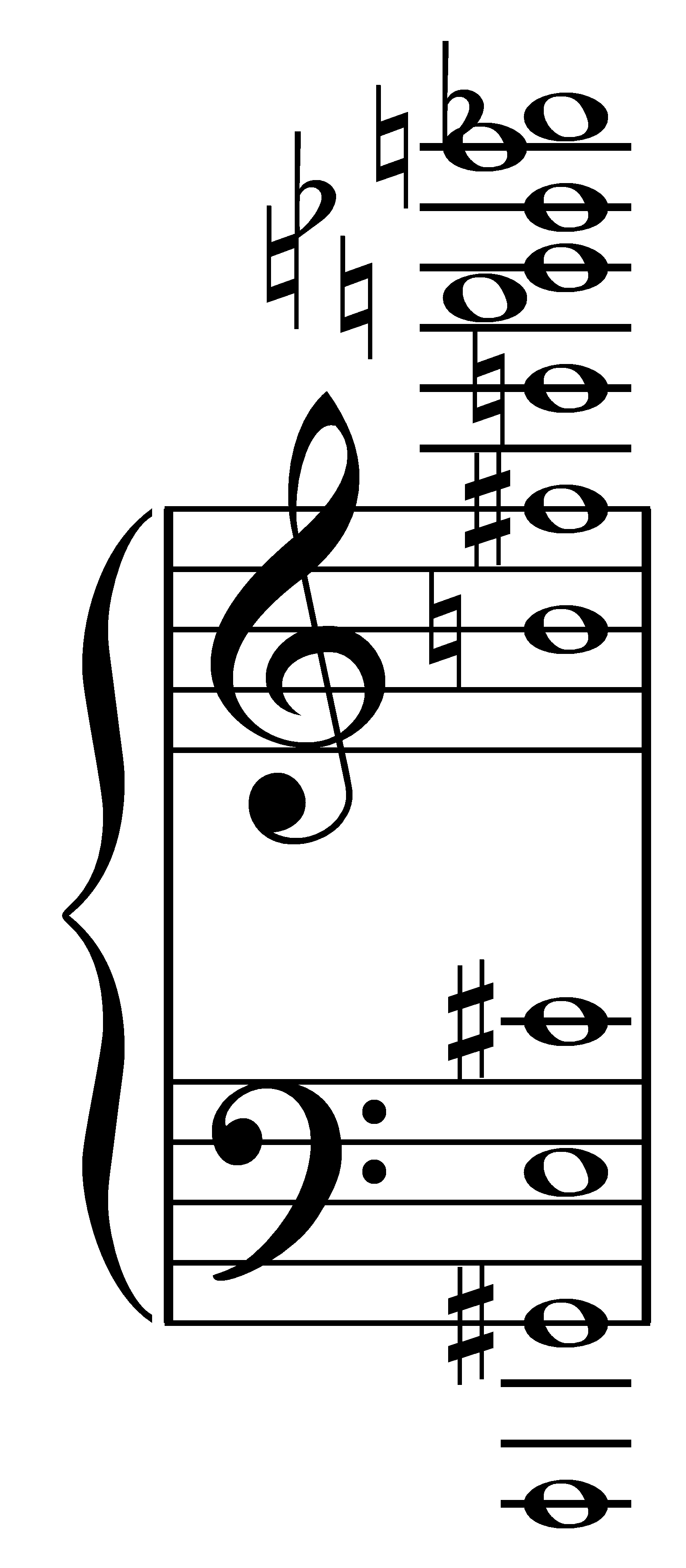
Mother chord

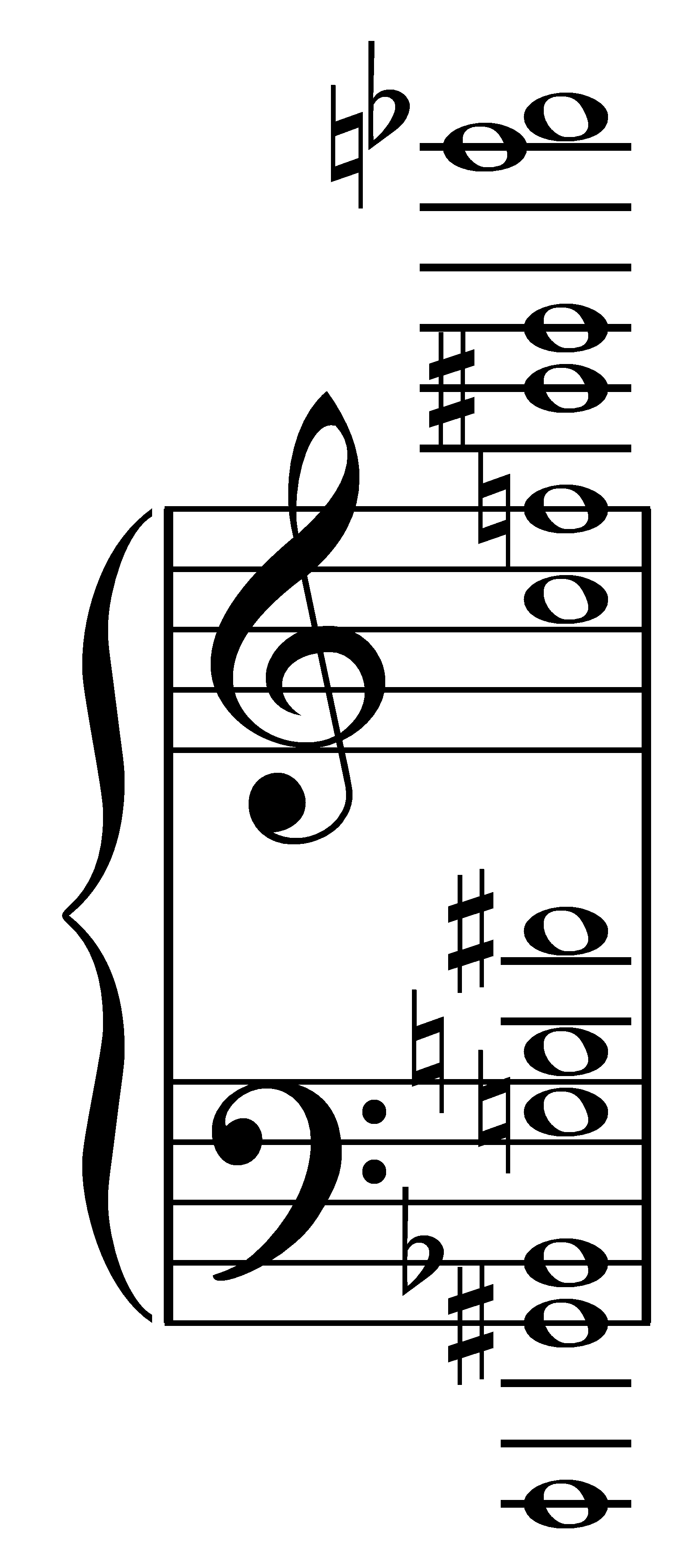
Grandmother chord

The first known all-interval row, F, E, C, A, G, D, A♭, D♭, E♭, G♭, B♭, C♭, was named the Mutterakkord (mother chord) by Fritz Heinrich Klein, who created it in 1921 for his chamber-orchestra composition Die Maschine.

0 e 7 4 2 9 3 8 t 1 5 6

The intervals between consecutive pairs of notes are the following (t = 10, e = 11):

 e 8 9 t 7 6 5 2 3 4 1

Klein used the Mother chord in his Die Maschine, Op. 1, and derived it from the Pyramid chord [Pyramidakkord]:

0 0 e 9 6 2 9 3 8 0 3 5 6

difference

   e t 9 8 7 6 5 4 3 2 1

by transposing the underlined notes (0369) down two semitones. The Pyramid chord consists of every interval stacked, low to high, from 12 to 1 and while it contains all intervals, it does not contain all pitch classes and is thus not a tone row. Klein chose the name Mutterakkord in order to avoid a longer term such as all-interval twelve-tone row and because it is a chord which unites all other chords by containing them within itself.

The Mother chord row was also used by Alban Berg in his Lyric Suite (1926) and in his second setting of Theodor Storm's poem Schliesse mir die Augen beide.

Chromatic scale

In contrast, the chromatic scale only contains the interval 1 between each consecutive note:

0 1 2 3 4 5 6 7 8 9 t e
 1 1 1 1 1 1 1 1 1 1 1

and is thus not an all-interval row.

=== Grandmother chord ===
The Grandmother chord is an eleven-interval, twelve-note, invertible chord with all of the properties of the Mother chord. Additionally, the intervals are so arranged that they alternate odd and even intervals (counted by semitones) and that the odd intervals successively decrease by one whole-tone while the even intervals successively increase by one whole-tone. It was invented by Nicolas Slonimsky on February 13, 1938.

    0   e   1   t   2   9   3   8   4   7   5   6
     \ / \ / \ / \ / \ / \ / \ / \ / \ / \ / \ /
odd:  e   |   9   |   7   |   5   |   3   |   1
even:     2       4       6       8       t

A similar row, although with all the notes within the same octave by alternating ascending and descending intervals (where the size of all the intervals decrease by one), was used by Kaikhosru Shapurji Sorabji as the first subject in the sextuple fugue of his Organ Symphony No. 3.

=== Link chords ===
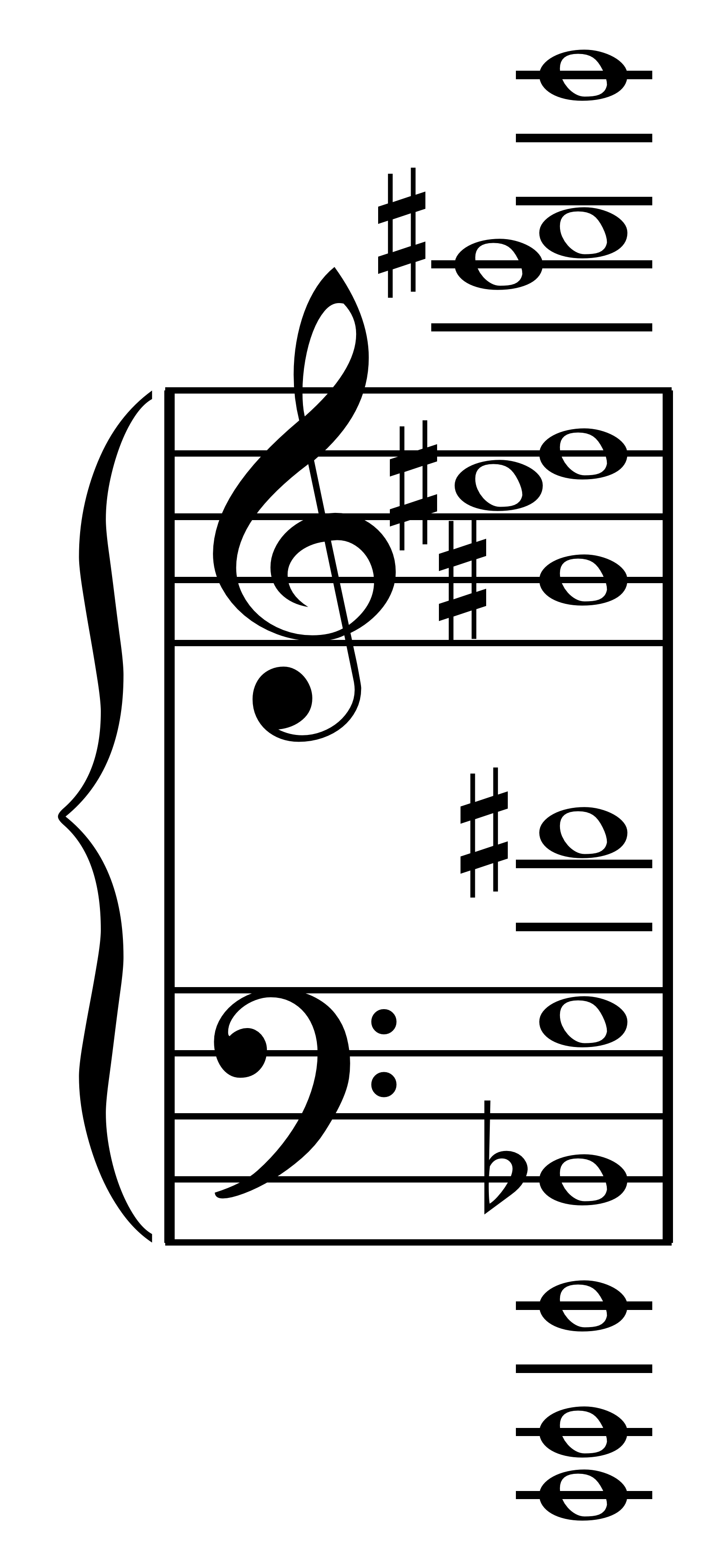
'Link' chord used once in Carter's "End of Chapter".

'Link' chords are all-interval twelve-tone sets containing one or more uninterrupted instances of the all-trichord hexachord ({012478}). Found by John F. Link, they have been used by Elliott Carter in pieces such as Symphonia.

0 1 4 8 7 2 e 9 3 5 t 6
 1 3 4 e 7 9 t 6 2 5 8
0 4 e 5 2 1 3 8 9 7 t 6
 4 7 6 9 e 2 5 1 t 3 8

There are four 'Link' chords which are RI-invariant.

0 t 3 e 2 1 7 8 5 9 4 6
 t 5 8 3 e 6 1 9 4 7 2

0 t 9 5 8 1 7 2 e 3 4 6
 t e 8 3 5 6 7 9 4 1 2

== See also ==
- All-interval tetrachord
