= Schoenberg hexachord =

Musical motif representing Arnold Schoenberg

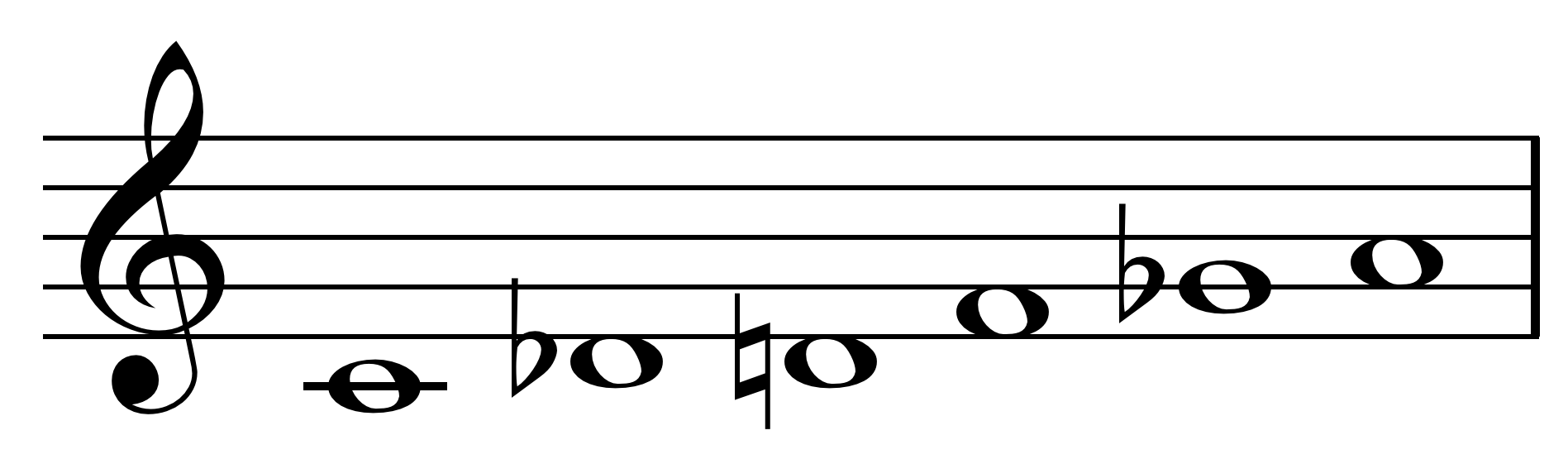
6-Z44: "Schoenberg hexachord".

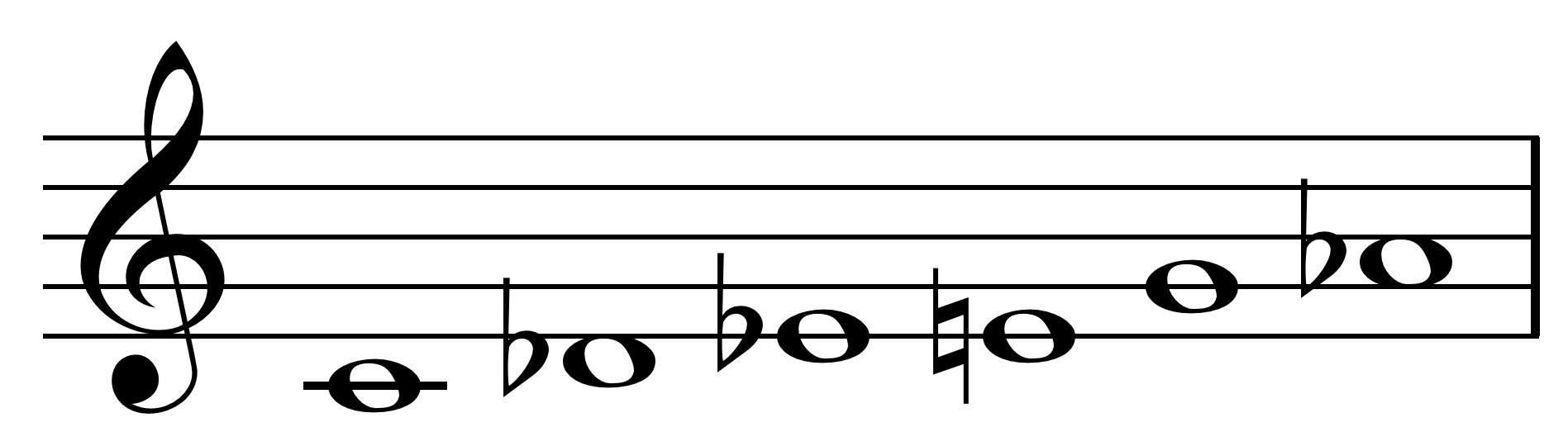
6-Z19: "Schoenberg hexachord" complement in prime form.

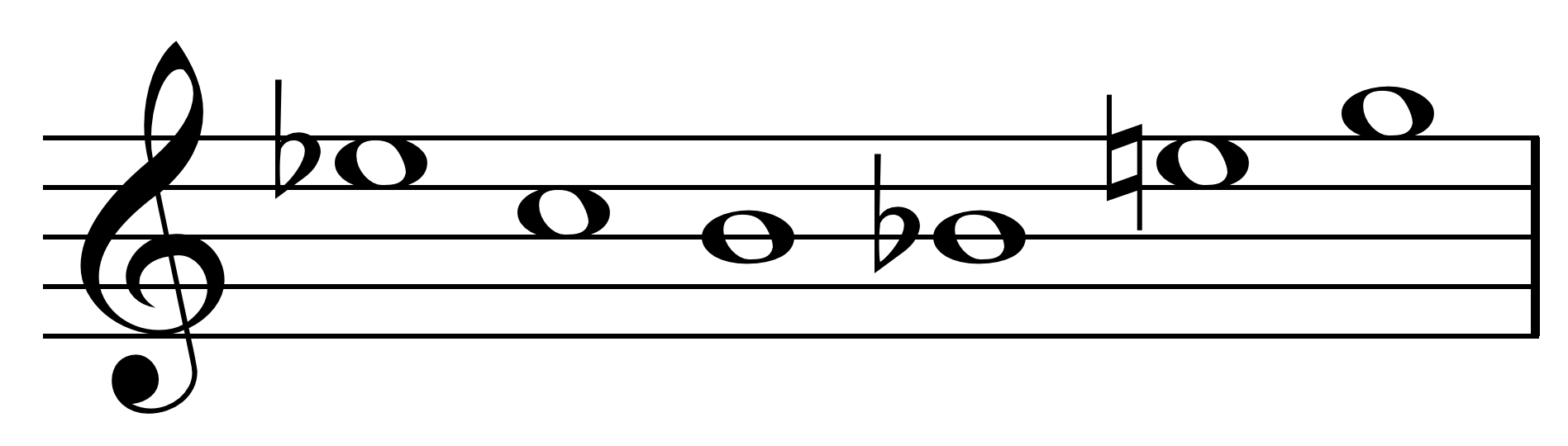
"Schoenberg hexachord" at "EsCHBEG" transposition and ordering.

6-Z44 (012569), known as the Schoenberg hexachord, is Arnold Schoenberg's signature hexachord, as one transposition contains the pitches [A], Es, C, H, B, E, G (A. Schoenberg), E♭, B, and B♭ being Es, H, and B in German.

Its Z-related hexachord and complement is 6-Z19 (3478te or, in prime form, 013478). They have the interval vector of <3,1,3,4,3,1> in common. 6-Z44 lacks prime and inversional combinatoriality. 6-Z44 contains set 3-3 twice and set 3-4 twice. Set 7-22 contains 6-Z44 twice and 6-Z19 twice.

Schoenberg used the hexachord in the song "Seraphita" (op. 22 no. 1) and the monodrama Die glückliche Hand. 6-Z44 is associated with the character Hauptmann in Alban Berg's Wozzeck. Each movement of Berg's 1913 Four Pieces for Clarinet and Piano (op. 5) begins with a statement of 6-Z44 or 6-Z19. John Weinzweig uses two minor triads a semitone apart, 6-Z19, and their complement, 6-Z44, in an aggregate chord at the end of "City of Brass" from Wine of Peace as well as in the tone row for his Piano Concerto. 6-Z44 is one of the "fundamental harmonies in the last movement," of Igor Stravinsky's The Rite of Spring, "Sacrificial Dance".
