= Hexachord =

Six-note series in musical notation

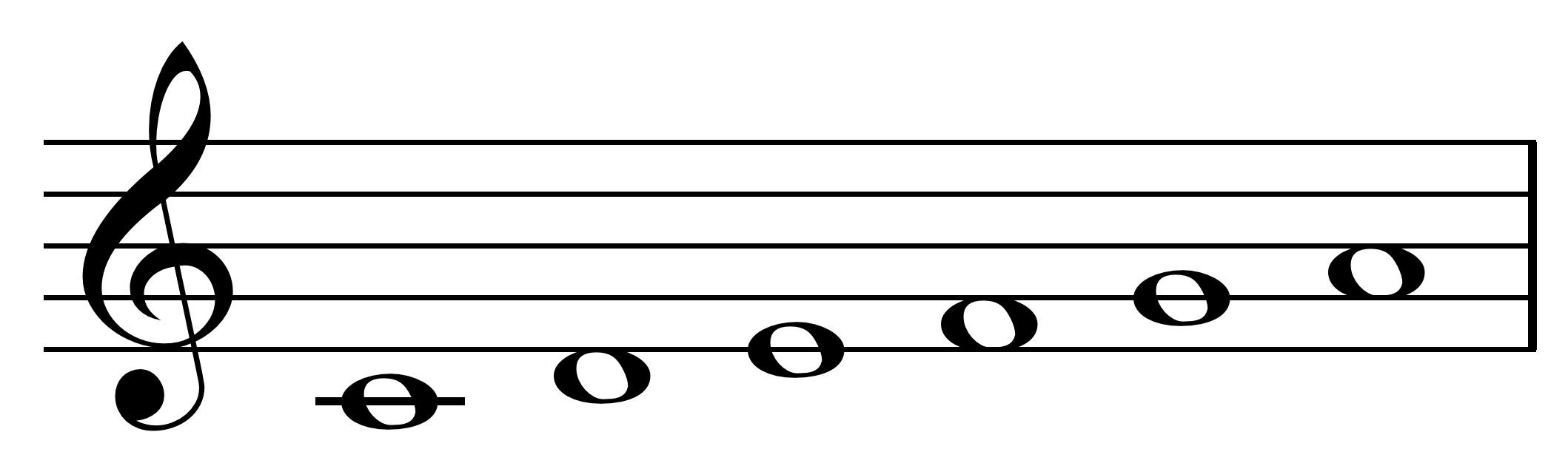
A hexachord originating on C.

A hexachord is a collection of six musical notes. The term derives from the Greek word ἑξάχορδος, a compound of ἕξ (hex, six) and χορδή (chordē).

== Usage ==
Since the 11th century, hexachords have been used in music pedagogy. Guido of Arezzo is the nominal creator of a learning system that relied on a six-note scale to facilitate rapid learning of melodies. Hexachord also could refer to the musical interval of a sixth.

Hexachord ostinato, in cello, which opens Die Jakobsleiter by Arnold Schoenberg, notable for its compositional use of hexachords

In the 20th century, music theorists broadened the definition of the hexachord into any collection of six notes. The notes did not need to be contiguous members of a scale or tone row. David Lewin used the term in this sense as early as 1959. Carlton Gamer uses hexachord and hexad interchangeably.

== See also ==
- Hexatonic scale
- Musica ficta
- Guidonian hand
- Combinatoriality
- Hexachordal complementation
- 6-20, 6-34, 6-Z43, and 6-Z44
