= Nondominant seventh chord =

Diatonic seventh chord without dominant function

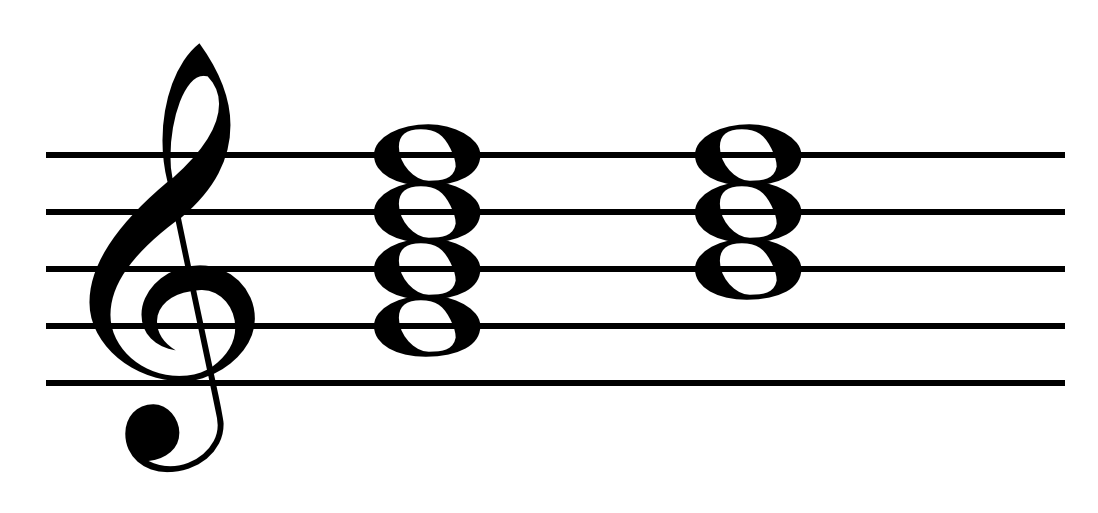
Dominant seventh (V^{7}) and incomplete dominant seventh (vii^{o}) in C major: G7 and b^{o} chords.

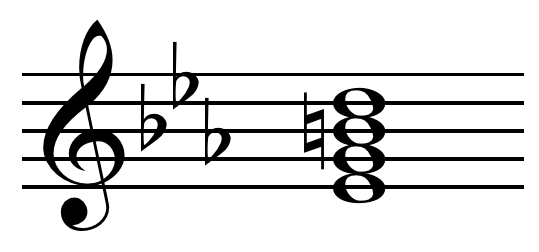
III+^{7}_{M} chord in C harmonic or ascending melodic minor.

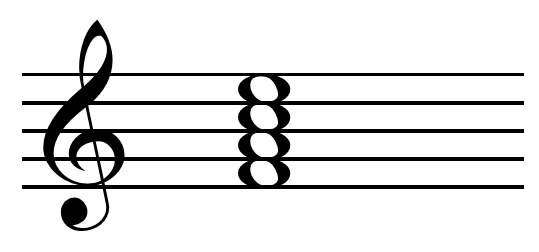
Major seventh chord on F. IV^{7} in C major.

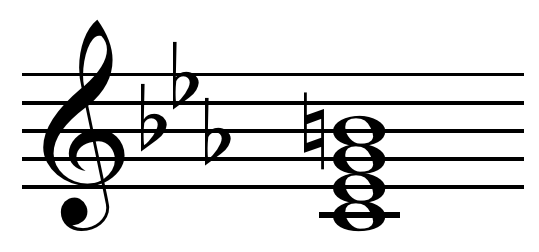
Minor major seventh chord on C.
i^{7}_{M} in C melodic or ascending melodic minor.

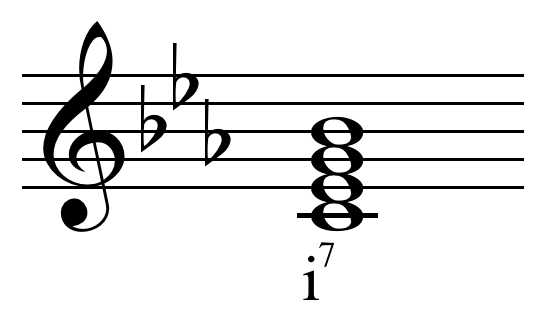
Minor-minor (i^{7}) seventh chord on C.

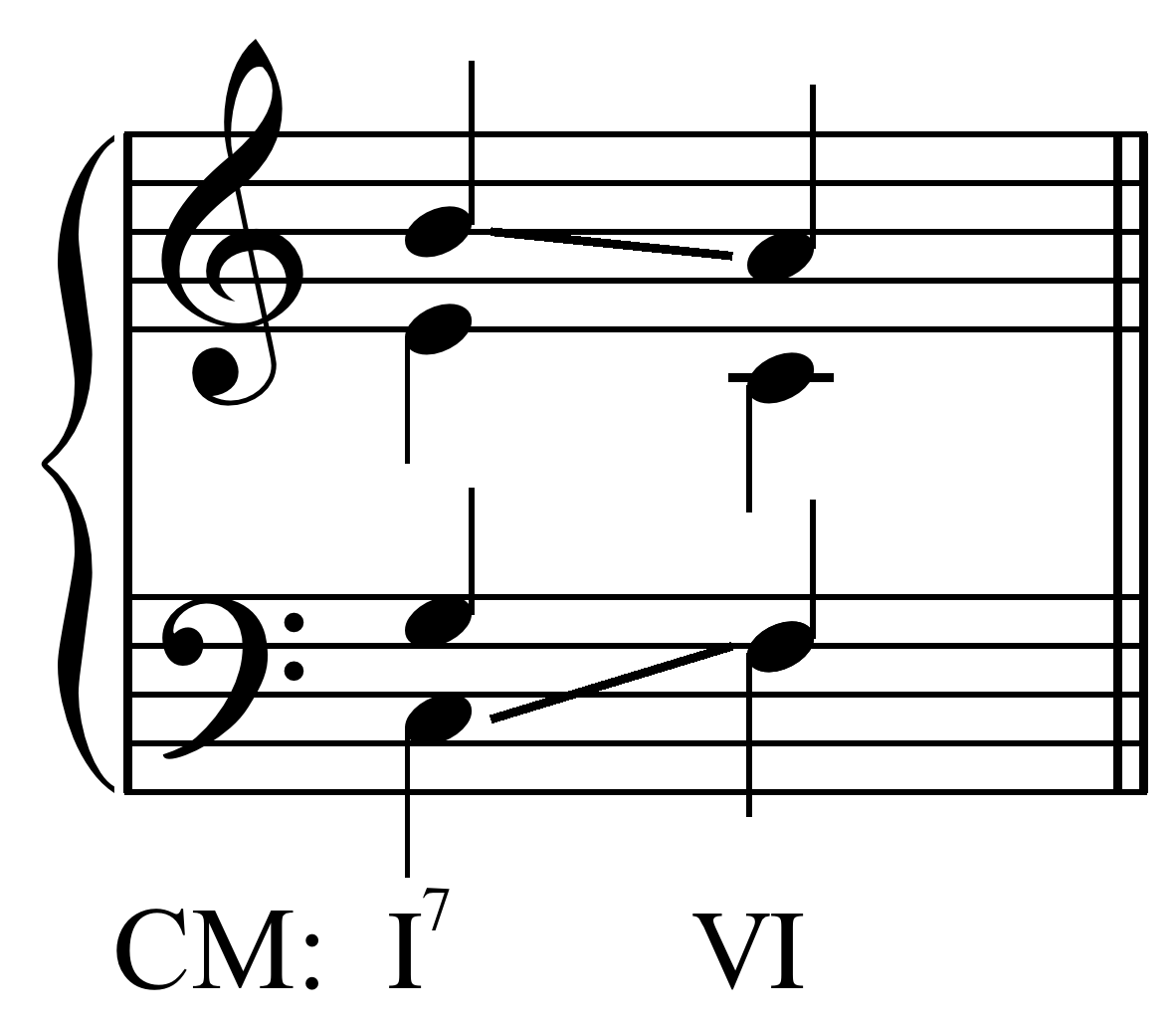
Nondominant seventh chord resolution along a circle progression, the seventh resolves down by step to the third of the next chord: I^{7}–IV. B resolves to A.

In music theory, a nondominant seventh chord is both a diatonic chord and a seventh chord, but it does not possess dominant function, and thus it is not a dominant seventh chord.

Since the V and vii^{o} chords are the dominant function chords, the "major minor seventh" V^{7} and "half-diminished seventh" vii^{ø}^{7} are the dominant seventh chords. Since the nondominant function chords are I, i, ii, ii^{o}, iii, III, IV, iv, vi, and VI, the nondominant seventh chord qualities include the augmented major seventh chord, major seventh chord, minor major seventh chord, minor seventh chord, and major minor seventh chords that do not possess dominant function, such as, in melodic minor, IV^{7}_{m}.

To analyze seventh chords indicate the quality of the triad; major: I, minor: ii, half-diminished: vii^{ø}, or augmented: III+; and the quality of the seventh; same: ^{7}, or different: ^{7}_{M} or ^{7}_{m}. With chord letters used to indicate the root and chord quality, and add ^{7}, thus a seventh chord on ii in C major (minor minor seventh) would be d^{7}.

As with dominant seventh chords, nondominant seventh chords often resolve by stepwise progression around the circle of fifths—that is, by intervals of a descending fifth (clockwise) or ascending fourth (counter-clockwise). In the following example, III+^{7}_{M} resolves to vi or VI.

Nondominant seventh chords are, "found in large number," in popular music and jazz ("a legacy from the romantic period"), such as in this example from "Try To Remember" (The Fantasticks) by Harvey Schmidt (lyrics: Tom Jones). Note the circle progression derived root motion by fourths/fifths.

Root motion through these perfect intervals is already compelling, but becomes even more so with seventh chords, because it naturally produces the smoothest continuous voice leading, swapping the voices of the third and seventh function in lockstep. The seventh of nondominant seventh chords moves down by step to the third of the following chord.

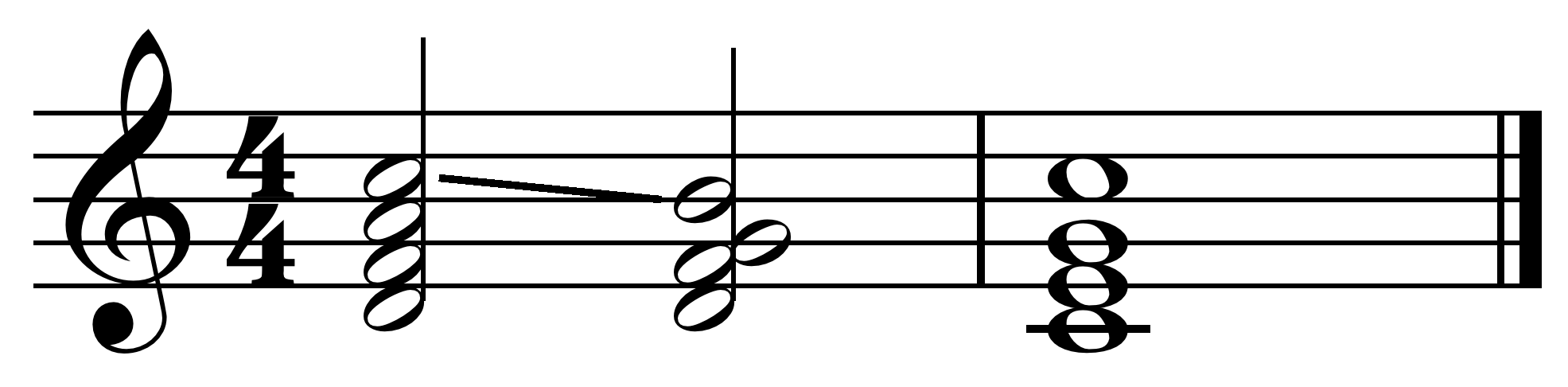
ii^{7}–V^{7}–I turnaround in C.

== See also ==
- Irregular resolution
- Diminished seventh chord (vii^{o}^{7} in harmonic minor)
- Dominant ninth, etc.
- Dominant seventh flat five chord (V^{7♭5})
