= Vocal harmony =

Style of vocal music

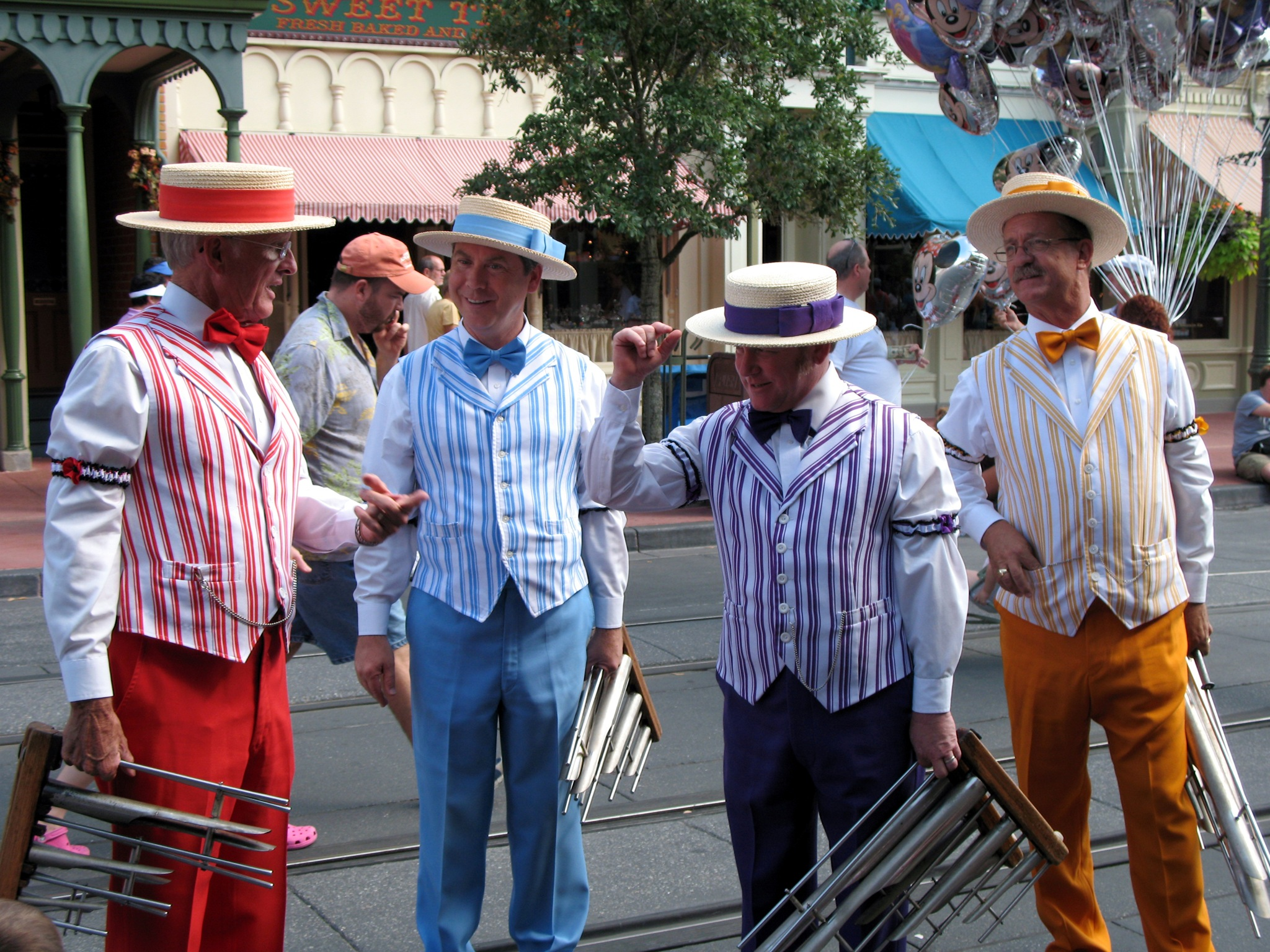
The Dapper Dans, a barbershop quartet singing in four-part harmony at Walt Disney World

Vocal harmony is a style of vocal music in which a consonant note or notes are simultaneously sung as a main melody in a predominantly homophonic texture. Vocal harmonies are used in many subgenres of European art music, including Classical choral music and opera and in the popular styles from many Western cultures ranging from folk songs and musical theater pieces to rock ballads. In the simplest style of vocal harmony, the main vocal melody is supported by a single backup vocal line, either at a pitch which is above or below the main vocal line, often in thirds or sixths which fit in with the chord progression used in the song. In more complex vocal harmony arrangements, different backup singers may sing two or even three other notes at the same time as each of the main melody notes, mostly with a consonant, pleasing-sounding thirds, sixths, and fifths (although dissonant notes may be used as short passing notes).

== In art music ==
Vocal harmonies have been an important part of Western art music since the Renaissance-era introduction of Mass melodies harmonized in sweet thirds and sixths. With the rise of the Lutheran church's chorale hymn singing style, congregations sang hymns arranged with four or five-part vocal harmony. In the Romantic era of music during the 1800s, vocal harmonization became more complex, and arrangers began including more dissonant harmonies. Operas and choral music from the Romantic era used tense-sounding vocal harmonies with augmented and diminished intervals as an important tool for underscoring the drama of the music. With contemporary music from the 1900s and 2000s, composers made increasingly difficult demands on choirs which were singing in vocal harmony, such as instructions to sing microtonal notes or make percussive sounds.

== In popular music ==
To sing vocal harmony in a pop or rock context, backup singers need to be able to adjust the pitch of their notes so that they are in tune with the pitch of the lead vocalist and the band's instruments. As well, the rhythm of the backup harmony parts has to be in time with the lead singer and the rhythm section. While some bands use relatively simple harmony vocals, with long, slow-moving vocal harmony notes supporting the vocal lead during the chorus sections, other bands make the backup singers into more equal partners of the main vocalist. In more vocally oriented bands, backup singers may have to sing complex parts which demand a vocal agility and sensitivity equal to that of the main vocal line. Usually, pop and rock bands use harmony vocals while the rest of the band is playing; however, as an effect, some rock and pop harmony vocals are done a cappella, without instrumental accompaniment. This device became widely used in the end chorus section of 1980s and 1990s-era hard rock and heavy metal ballads as well as horror punk (which cites influence from both heavy metal and doo-wop).

=== Other roles ===
While some bands use backup singers who only sing when they are on stage, it is common for backup singers to have other roles while they are on stage. In many rock and metal bands, the musicians doing backup vocals also play instruments, such as keyboards, rhythm guitar or drums. In Latin or Afro-Cuban groups, backup singers may play percussion instruments or shakers while singing. In some pop and hip-hop groups and in musical theater, the backup singers may be required to perform elaborately choreographed dance routines while they sing through headset microphones.

=== Barbershop quartets ===
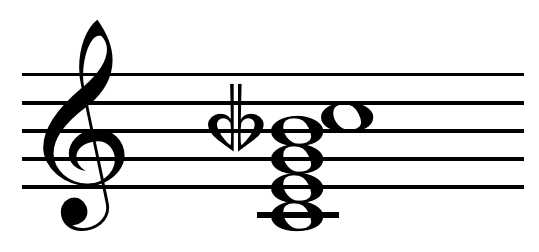
Barbershop chord on C.

One of the more complex styles of vocal harmony is the barbershop quartet style, in which the melody is harmonized in four parts. In a barbershop quartet arrangement, each voice has its own role: generally, the lead sings the melody, the tenor harmonizes above the melody, the bass sings the lowest harmonizing notes, and the baritone completes the chord, usually below the lead. The melody is not usually sung by the tenor or bass. Barbershop quartets are more likely to use dissonant and "tense"-sounding dominant seventh chords than pop or rock bands.

=== Doo-wop groups ===
Doo-wop is a style of vocal-based rhythm and blues music, which developed in African-American communities in the 1940s and which achieved mainstream popularity in the US both in the 1950s to the early 1960s. It used smooth, consonant vocal harmonies, with a number of singers imitating instruments while singing nonsense syllables. For example, in The Ravens' song "Count Every Star" (1950), the singers imitate the "doomph", "doomph" plucking-sound of a double bass. Well-known hits include "In the Still of the Night (I Remember)" by The Five Satins and "Get a Job" by The Silhouettes, a hit in 1958. Doo-wop remained popular until just before the British Invasion of 1964.

== See also ==
- A cappella
- Barbershop arranging
- Close and open harmony
