= Tiddler =

Tiddler may refer to:

- A small fish, especially the three-spined stickleback
- Tiddler, the basic component of a TiddlyWiki

== See also ==
- Tom Tiddler's Ground, children's game
- Tom Tiddler's Ground, collaborative work by Charles Dickens
- Tiddly, a term in barbershop arranging
- Tittle
- Tiddler the Story-telling Fish, children's book by Julia Donaldson and Axel Scheffler
