= Richard Edward Wilson =

American composer (born 1941)

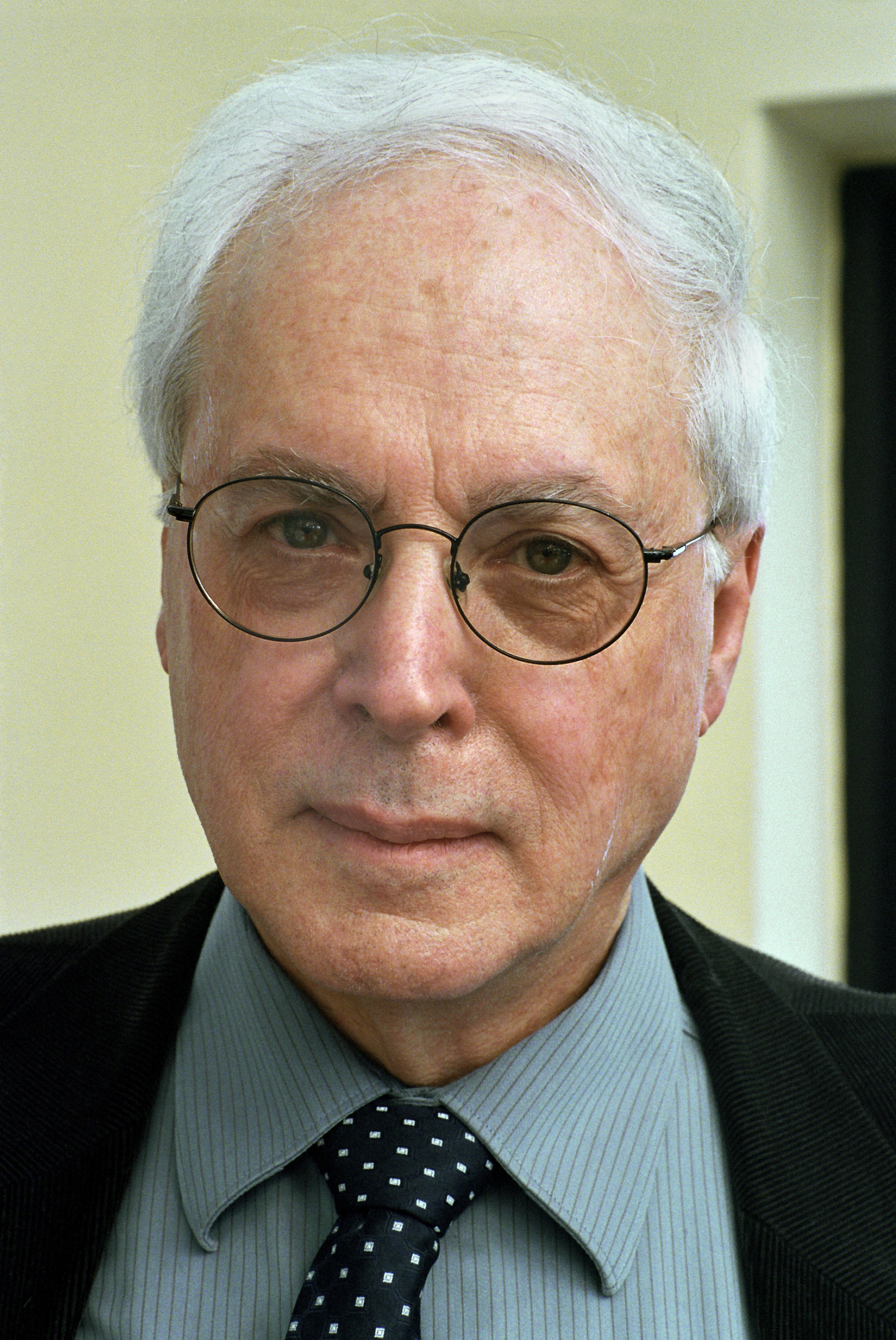
- Born: May 15, 1941 (age 85); Cleveland, Ohio, US
- Education: Harvard University, Rutgers University
- Occupations: Composer, pianist, professor
- Website: www.richardwilson.org

Richard Edward Wilson (born May 15, 1941) is an American composer and pianist. Rejecting serialism, to some extent Wilson engages in tonality, though often with the use of considerable chromaticism. His oeuvre includes orchestral, operatic, instrumental, and chamber music among other genres.

== Life and career ==
Wilson was born in Cleveland, Ohio, where he was at a young age drawn to the concerts of George Szell and the Cleveland Orchestra. His studied piano with Roslyn Raish, Egbert Fischer, and Leonard Shure. He studied cello with Robert Ripley and Ernst Silberstein. In 1963, Wilson graduated magna cum laude and Phi Beta Kappa from Harvard University, where he studied with Robert Moevs and Randall Thompson. He later received an MA from Rutgers University. From 1966 to 2016, he taught at Vassar College, where he was Mary Conover Mellon Professor of Music. Since 1992 he has been composer-in-residence with the American Symphony Orchestra.

== Music ==
Richard Wilson's compositions are marked by a stringent yet lyrical atonality which often sets him apart from the established schools of modern American music: minimalism, twelve-tone, neo-romanticism, and avant-garde. Two of his works, Eclogue for solo piano, and his String Quartet No. 3, are considered high points of twentieth-century American music. His large-scale orchestral works include the Symphony No. 1, premiered by the Hudson Valley Philharmonic and recorded by the New Zealand Symphony Orchestra; Articulations, written for the San Francisco Symphony. Wilson is also the composer of the one-act whimsical opera, Æthelred the Unready, based on the exploits of the ill-advised Saxon king, Æthelred II of England. He classified the three types of irregular resolutions of dominant seventh chords.

== Critical response ==
Wilson has been praised by 21st Century Music as a "splendidly talented and highly accomplished composer whose music rewards seeking out" and by the New York Sun as "possessed of a hard-won idiom that has grown and developed over the years into a probing blend of wit, classic form, modern harmony, and impressionistic color."

Writing in the New Yorker, Andrew Porter called his String Quartet No. 3 a "richly wrought and unusual composition," while the New York Times has deemed it "a work of substance and expressivity ... [that] merits a place in the active repertory."

In a review of a recent concert, the New York Times wrote, "Richard Wilson's Diablerie stood apart, contemporary in its vocabulary and grammar but pursuing always the long, lyrical, sometimes operatically expressive lines and Romantic-era concerto writing." A review in Strings Magazine heralded the same composition as "another gem in Wilson's mélange of solo pieces."

== Honors ==
In 2004 Wilson received an Academy Award in Music from the American Academy of Arts and Letters, from which he previously received the Walter Hinrichsen Award. Other recent honors include: the Stoeger Prize from the Chamber Music Society of Lincoln Center; a Guggenheim Fellowship; the Cleveland Arts Prize; residencies at the Bogliasco Foundation and the Bellagio Center in Italy; and commissions from the Koussevitsky and Fromm Foundations, Chamber Music America, the Chicago Chamber Musicians, the Walter W. Naumburg Foundation, the Library of Congress, and the San Francisco Symphony.

== Works ==
=== Orchestra ===
- (1970) Initiation
- (1979) Violin Concerto
- (1983) Bassoon Concerto
- (1984) Symphony No. 1
- (1986) Symphony No. 2
- (1991) Piano Concerto
- (1991) Articulations
- (1994) Agitations
- (1994) Triple Concerto
- (1995) Pamietam
- (1997) A Child's London
- (1999) Intimations
- (2003) Peregrinations
- (2003) Silhouette with Revelry
- (2004) Four Love Songs
- (2006) Chamisha Tehillim
- (2008) The Cello Has Many Secrets
- (2010) Symphony No. 3
- (2010) Soundcheck
- (2021) Bravado

=== Works for mixed ensemble ===
- (1963) Suite for Five Players
- (1964) Trio for Oboe, Violin and Cello
- (1965) Fantasy and Variations
- (1967) Concert Piece
- (1969) Music for Violin and Cello
- (1969) Quartet for Flutes, Bass, and Harpsichord
- (1974) Wind Quintet
- (1978) Serenade: Variations on a Simple March
- (1979) Deux pas de Trois
- (1980) Figuration
- (1981) Short Notice
- (1981) Gnomics
- (1982) Character Studies
- (1982) Dithyramb
- (1983) Suite for Winds
- (1984) Line Drawings
- (1988) Contentions
- (1989) Sonata for Viola and Piano
- (1990) Affirmations
- (1996) Three Interludes for Violin and Piano
- (2000) Motivations
- (2001) Canzona on YouTube
- (2003) Piano Trio
- (2005) Brash Attacks
- (2005) Senza Furore
- (2011) Speculation
- (2011) Mixed Signals for Violin and Piano
- (2012) Quintet for Clarinet and Strings on YouTube
- (2014) Distractions, for six instruments on YouTube
- (2015) Reed Actions, for clarinet and bassoon
- (2015) Add Hocket, for percussion ensemble
- (2016) Outswappings, for clarinet quartet
- (2021) Not a Waltz, for flute and piano
- (2021) The World As It Is, for flute and piano
- (2021) Drastic Measures, for mixed ensemble

=== Works for string quartet ===
- (1969) String Quartet No. 1
- (1977) String Quartet No. 2
- (1982) String Quartet No. 3 Archived May 10, 2008, at the Wayback Machine
- (1998, 2001) String Quartet No. 4
- (2008) String Quartet No. 5
- (2018) String Quartet No. 6

=== Works for solo piano ===
- (1963) Three Short Pieces for Piano
- (1974) Eclogue
- (1979) Sour Flowers
- (1984) A Child's London
- (1985) Fixations
- (1986) Intercalations
- (2009) Mnemonics
- (2013) Charades
- (2017) Mimesis
- (2018) Disclosures

=== Works for solo instruments ===
- (1971) Music for Solo Cello
- (1972) Music for Solo Flute
- (1980) Profound Utterances
- (1985) Flutations
- (1987) Lord Chesterfield to His Son
- (1988) Music for Solo Viola
- (1989) Intonations
- (1992) Civilization and Its Discontents
- (1995) Touchstones
- (2000) Ironies
- (2004) Diablerie Archived May 9, 2008, at the Wayback Machine
- (2003) Organicity
- (2006) Gravitas
- (2010) Lullaby for Sonya, for solo clarinet
- (2002/2017) Aethelred's Exit, for solo bass clarinet
- (2020) Four Solitudes for Solo Flute
- (2020) Four Solitudes for Solo English Horn
- (2020) Four Solitudes for Solo Violin
- (2020) Four Solitudes for Solo Viola

=== Works for voice ===
- (1975) The Ballad of Longwood Glen
- (1980) A Theory
- (1984) Three Painters
- (1988) Tribulations
- (1990) Persuasions
- (1991) The Second Law
- (1992) On the Street
- (1995) Five Love Songs on Poems by John Skelton
- (1996) Lights on the River
- (1996) Transfigured Goat
- (2000) Three Songs on Poems by John Ashbery
- (2005) Visits to St. Elizabeth's
- (2006) Three Songs on Poems by Paul Kane
- (2006) I Walked Through the Medieval Town
- (2009) Two Songs on Poems by Eamon Grennan
- (2009) Four Songs on Poems by John Updike
- (2012) With Lullay, Lullay Like a Child
- (2013) Miss Foggerty's Cake
- (2013) Psalm 42 in Gaelic on YouTube
- (2014) Limericks, for two sopranos on YouTube
- (2014) On The Death of Juan Gelman
- (2017) Obviously Quite Easy, for soprano and bassoon
- (2017) Puer Natus Est, for tenor and organ
- (2017) Come, My Celia, for soprano and piano
- (2017) Three Songs for Friends, for soprano and piano
- (2018) Words and Music: An Argument, for soprano, baritone, two clarinets and piano
- (2018) Fugue (Phillis Levin)
- (2018) Talking, Walking, Drifting (Sarah Plimpton)
- (2018) Katya’s Great Romance, for bass, cello and narrator (Michael Salcman)
- (2018) Wait Until Dusk (Joseph-Francis Meltzer)
- (2020) Market Women (Karen Swenson)
- (2020) In the Old School Yard (Carole Goodman)
- (2021) Boogie Woogie (Adam Zagajewski)

=== Works for choir ===
- (1968) A Dissolve
- (1968) Can
- (1968) Light in Spring Poplars
- (1968, 1972) In Schrafft's
- (1969) Soaking
- (1970) Home From the Range
- (1971) Elegy
- (1972) Hunter's Moon
- (1976) August 22
- (1995) Poor Warren
- (2013) Fables: Three Poems of Ennis Rees after Aesop

=== Opera ===
- (1994, 2001) Aethelred the Unready

=== Concert band ===
- (1981) Eleven Sumner Place
- (1987) Jubilation

== Selected discography ==
- Richard Wilson: Brash Attacks Albany Records TROY 1080
- Richard Wilson: Diablerie Albany Records TROY 773
- Richard Wilson: String Quartets Albany Records TROY 573
- Richard Wilson: Aethelred the Unready Albany Records TROY 512
- Richard Wilson: Affirmations Albany Records TROY 389
- Richard Wilson: Symphony No. 1 Koch International Classics/ Peermusic Classical
- Stresses in the Peaceable Kingdom: The Choral Music of Richard Wilson Albany Records TROY 333
- Richard Wilson: Chamber Music Albany Records TROY 074
- Richard Wilson: String Quartet No. 3, Eclogue, et al. CRI/ New World Records NWCR602
- Richard Wilson: Bassoon Concerto CRI/ New World Records NWCR575
- Richard Wilson: Piano Concerto CRI/ New World Records NWCR618

== Sources ==
- "Archive from Tuesday, November 29, 2016 - Concerts to celebrate the work of retiring music professor and composer Richard Wilson (12/10, 12/11) - News - Info - Vassar College".
- International Who's Who
- "Richard Wilson and His Music" by Bernard Jacobson
- "Richard Wilson," entry in The New Grove Dictionary of Music and Musicians (2001), vol 27, p. 425.
- "Richard Wilson," entry in The New Grove Dictionary of American Music (1986), vol. 4, pp. 539–40.
- "Richard Wilson," entry in Baker's Biographical Dictionary of Musicians, 5th edition with supplement (1971), ed. N. Slonimsky, p. 254.
- "Richard Wilson," entry in The Norton/Grove Concise Encyclopedia of Music (1994), ed. Stanley Sadie, p. 891.
- James Reel: "A Modernist with a Taste for the Premodern: Composer Richard Wilson" Fanfare, xxiv/4 (2001), 93–6, 98.
- Ping-Ting Lan: New Resources in Twentieth-Century Piano Music and Richard Wilson’s "Eclogue" (diss., U. of North Texas, 1974).
- Mary Frantz: Richard Wilson: The Solo Piano Works (diss., U. of Wisconsin-Madison, 1992).
