= Barbershop arranging =

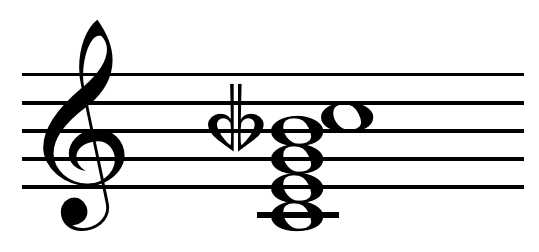
Barbershop chord on C.

Barbershop arranging is the art of creating arrangements of barbershop music. Barbershop Harmony Society (BHS) and SingUnited International (SUI) have prescribed rules that dictate what is an acceptable arrangement, particularly with regard to singing in competition. This makes barbershop arranging a specialist form of arranging, rarely tackled by those outside barbershop; likewise, barbershop arrangers tend to be known only for their barbershop arrangements rather than for their work in any other musical form.

== Technical requirements ==
The following two paragraphs from BHS indicate technical requirements of a barbershop arrangement for use in a BHS contest:

Barbershop harmony is a style of unaccompanied vocal music characterized by consonant four-part chords for every melody note in a predominantly homophonic texture. Each of the four parts has its own role: the lead sings the melody, with the tenor harmonizing above the melody, the bass singing the lowest harmonizing notes, and the baritone completing the chord. The melody is not sung by the tenor or bass, except for an infrequent note or two to avoid awkward voice leading, in tags or codas, or when some appropriate embellishing effect can be created. Occasional brief passages may be sung by fewer than four voice parts.
Barbershop music features songs with understandable lyrics and easily singable melodies, whose tones clearly define a tonal center and imply major and minor chords and barbershop (dominant and secondary dominant) seventh chords that resolve primarily around the circle of fifths, while making frequent use of other resolutions. What sets barbershop apart from other musical styles is the predominant use of the dominant-type seventh chords. Barbershop music also features a balanced, symmetrical form and a standard meter. The basic song and its harmonization are embellished by the arranger to provide appropriate support of the song's theme and to close the song effectively.

So-called barbershop seventh chords should represent at least one third of the song’s duration. As an example of circle-of-fifths resolution, a tonic–subdominant progression will often use the tonic 7th instead, if it advances the forward motion of the song. Close harmony prevails and other commons chords include the diminished seventh, augmented sixth, and added sixth chords.

The quality of musical choices are vital to the success of a barbershop arrangement. A skillful arrangement, well executed, will provide the audience with an emotionally satisfying and entertaining experience.

== Terms ==
Swipe (on "rose": last measure) from "Sweet Rosie O'Grady", Shannon Quartet (1924).

A swipe is when one or more parts change pitch while the other parts hold their pitch. This provides rhythmic drive and either a chord change or a filling out of one chord. Swipes are on a single syllable.

For example, a filling out:

     Triad --> 7th chord --> Triad
T    Third  =  Third      =  Third
L    Root   =  Root       =  Root
Bar. Fifth --> Seventh   --> Fifth
B    Root  --> Fifth     --> Root

A tiddly is an embellishment in one or two voices over one chord, resembling neighbor tones or suspensions. This provides rhythmic drive, and may derive from black vocal improvisation.

== Learning to arrange barbershop ==
Anyone with a knowledge of music theory who can arrange should be able to write a barbershop arrangement. However, an understanding of the art form as it is practiced and judged in competition is undoubtedly an advantage. A music category judge can assess an arrangement by ear or eye to test whether it is 'barbershop', and hence valid for use in competition. BHS and its affiliated associations run courses in arranging at 'Harmony University' (formerly 'Harmony College'), which are open to members.

Relevant manuals: "Theory of Barbershop Harmony", "Barbershop Arranging Manual" and "Contest and Judging Manual" are published by BHS.

== See also ==
- A cappella music
- American Harmony Documentary Film about Barbershop music
