= Augmented major seventh chord =

Chord

augmented major seventh chord
Component intervals from root
- major seventh
- augmented fifth
- major third
- root

Tuning
- 16:20:25:30

Forte no. / Complement
- 4-19B / 8-19

In music, an augmented major seventh chord or major seventh sharp five chord is a seventh chord composed of a root, major third, augmented fifth, and major seventh (1, 3, ♯5, 7). It can be viewed as an augmented triad with an additional major seventh. When using popular-music symbols, it is denoted by e.g. +^{Δ7}. For example, the augmented major seventh chord built on A♭, written as e.g. A♭+^{Δ7}, has pitches A♭-C-E-G:

The chord can be represented by the integer notation {0, 4, 8, 11}.

The augmented major seventh chord is associated with the augmented scale (see jazz scale and chord-scale system). This chord also comes from the third mode of both the harmonic minor and the melodic minor scales. For example, the third mode of the A melodic minor scale outlines an augmented major seventh chord, as shown below.

As with dominant seventh chords, nondominant seventh chords including the augmented major seventh usually progress according to the circle, thus III+^{M7} resolves to vi or VI. For example, in the key of A minor, C maj^{7♯5} usually resolves to F.

== Augmented major seventh chord table ==
Chord	Root	Major third	Augmented fifth	Major seventh
Caug^{M7}	C	E	G♭	B
C♭aug^{M7}	C♭	E♭	G	B♭
Caug^{M7}	C	E	G♯	B
C♯aug^{M7}	C♯	E♯ (F)	G (A)	B♯ (C)
Caug^{M7}	C	E (F#)	G (A#)	B (C#)
D♭aug^{M7}	D♭	F	A	C
Daug^{M7}	D	F♯	A♯	C♯
D♯aug^{M7}	D♯	F (G)	A (B)	C (D)
E♭aug^{M7}	E♭	G	B	D
Eaug^{M7}	E	G♯	B♯ (C)	D♯
E♯aug^{M7}	E♯	G (A)	B (C♯)	D (E)
Eaug^{M7}	E	G (A#)	B (C#♯)	D (E#)
Faug^{M7}	F {Ebb}	A {Gb}	C {Bb}	E {Db}
Faug^{M7}	F {Eb}	A {G}	C♭ {B}	E {D}
F♭aug^{M7}	F♭	A♭	C	E♭
Faug^{M7}	F	A	C♯	E
F♯aug^{M7}	F♯	A♯	C (D)	E♯ (F)
G♭aug^{M7}	G♭	B♭	D	F
Gaug^{M7}	G	B	D♯	F♯
G♯aug^{M7}	G♯	B♯ (C)	D (E)	F (G)
A♭aug^{M7}	A♭	C	E	G
Aaug^{M7}	A	C♯	E♯ (F)	G♯
A♯aug^{M7}	A♯	C (D)	E (F♯)	G (A)
B♭aug^{M7}	B♭	D	F♯	A
Baug^{M7}	B	D♯	F (G)	A♯
B♯aug^{M7}	B♯	D (E)	F (G♯)	A (B)

== See also ==
- Jazz chord

== Bibliography ==
- Benward, Bruce; Saker, Marilyn Nadine (2003). Music: In Theory and Practice. Vol. I (7th ed.). McGraw-Hill. ISBN 978-0-07-294262-0.
