= Diablerie =

1997 role-playing game adventure

Diablerie is a 1997 role-playing game adventure published by White Wolf Publishing for Vampire: The Masquerade.

== Plot summary ==
Diablerie is an adventure in which two reprinted adventures feature underground quests, monster encounters, traps, illusions, and the promise of magical rewards. The first part is Awakening: Diablerie Mexico, while the second, Bloody Hearts: Diablerie Britain, places characters inside a demon's mind. The book also features sections on Diablerie—the act of consuming another vampire's blood—and the looming apocalypse known as Gehenna.

== Reception ==
Adam Tinworth reviewed Diablerie for Arcane magazine, rating it a 4 out of 10 overall, and stated that "The sections on Diablerie (the drinking of another vampire's blood), and the forthcoming end of the world (Gehenna) are interesting, and even if you can't face running the adventures straight – which would be a shame, dungeon bashes can be great fun – there are a number of character and ideas you can easily rip off for you own game. Given the fairly low price, Diablerie may be worth a look."
