= Robert Moevs =

American classical composer

Robert Walter Moevs (2 December 1920 – 10 December 2007) was an American composer of contemporary classical music. He was known for his highly chromatic music.

== Career ==
Moevs was born in La Crosse, Wisconsin, and served in the United States Army Air Forces as a pilot during World War II. He then received his degree from Harvard University. Moevs was a student of Walter Piston and Nadia Boulanger. He taught at Harvard University and Rutgers University. He received the Rome Prize (1952) and a Guggenheim Fellowship (1962). In 1978 his Concerto Grosso was awarded the Stockhausen International Prize in Composition.

His music has been performed by the Cleveland Orchestra, the Boston Symphony Orchestra and the Symphony of the Air. His papers, including unpublished scores and recordings, are held by the Rutgers Music Library. He died in Hillsborough, New Jersey.

== Discography ==
| Title / date | Performer | Label | Catalog no. |
|---|---|---|---|
| Piano Sonata (1950) | Joseph Bloch | New World Records | NWCRL136 |
| Musica Da Camera I (1965) | Contemporary Chamber Ensemble conducted by Arthur Weisberg | New World Records | NWCRL223 |
| Variazioni sopra una melodia (1961) | Jacob Glick / Robert Sylvester | New World Records | NWCRL223 |
| A Brief Mass (1968) | Kirkpatrick Chamber Choir conducted by David Drinkwater | New World Records | NWCRL262 |
| Fantasia sopra un motivo (1951) | Wanda Maximilien | New World Records | NWCRL404 |
| Phoenix (1972) | Wanda Maximilien | New World Records | NWCRL404 |
| Una collana musicale (1977) (excerpts) | Wanda Maximilien | New World Records | NWCRL404 |
| Concerto Grosso for Piano, Percussion and Orchestra (1960 / 68) | Orchestra of the 20th Century conducted by Arthur Weisberg, Wanda Maximilien soloist | New World Records | NWCRL457 |
| Una collana musicale (1977) (more excerpts) | Wanda Maximilien | New World Records | NWCRL496 |
| Pan (1951) | Karl Kraber | Orion Records | out of print |
| Saraband (1986) | Jory Vinikour | Dorian Sono Luminus | DSL 92174 |

== Notes ==
Sources

- Archibald, Bruce, and Richard Wilson. 2008. "Moevs, Robert (Walter)". Grove Music Online, edited by Dean Roote (accessed 1 October 2013).
