= Awakening: Diablerie Mexico =

1992 roleplay adventure

- Publisher: White Wolf Publishing

Awakening: Diablerie Mexico is a 1992 role-playing adventure for Vampire: The Masquerade published by White Wolf Publishing.

== Plot summary ==
Awakening: Diablerie Mexico is an adventure in which the player characters must obtain the blood from an Elder Vampire.

== Reception ==
Steve Crow reviewed Awakening: Diablerie Mexico in White Wolf #32 (July/Aug., 1992), rating it a 3 out of 5 and stated that "Overall, I recommend Awakening, but more for the Diablerie information and NPC background than for the adventure itself."

== Reviews ==
- Casus Belli V1 #93 (Apr 1996) p. 36-38
- Saga #16 (Sep 1992) p. 20
- Dosdediez #8 (Jul 1996) p. 17
