= Dominant seventh chord =

Musical chord

dominant seventh chord
Component intervals from root
- minor seventh
- perfect fifth
- major third
- root

Tuning
- 4:5:6:7, 20:25:30:36, or 36:45:54:64

Forte no. / Complement
- 4-27 / 8-27

In music theory, a dominant seventh chord, or major minor seventh chord, (Note: also written major-minor seventh chord) is a seventh chord composed of a root, major third, perfect fifth, and minor seventh; thus it is a major triad together with a minor seventh. It is often denoted by the letter name of the chord root and a superscript "7". Dominant seventh chords are typically built on the fifth degree (the dominant) of the major scale. An example is the dominant seventh chord built on G, written as G^{7}, having pitches G–B–D–F:

The leading note and the major third combined form a diminished fifth, also known as a tritone. The clashing sound produced by playing these two notes together gives the dominant seventh chord its dissonant quality (i.e. its harmonic instability).

Dominant seventh chords are often built on the fifth scale degree (or dominant) of a key. For instance, in the C major scale, G is the fifth note of the scale, and the seventh chord built on G is the dominant seventh chord of this scale, G^{7} (shown above). In this chord, F is a minor seventh above G. In Roman numeral analysis, G^{7} would be represented as V^{7} in the key of C major.

This chord also occurs on the seventh degree of any natural minor scale (e.g., G7 in A minor).

The dominant seventh is perhaps the most important of the seventh chords. It was the first seventh chord to appear regularly in classical music. The V^{7} chord is found almost as often as the V, the dominant triad, and typically functions to drive the piece strongly toward a resolution to the tonic of the key.

A dominant seventh chord can be represented by the integer notation {0, 4, 7, 10} relative to the dominant.

== History ==
The majority of Renaissance composers conceived of harmony in terms of intervals rather than chords; "however, certain dissonant sonorities suggest that the dominant seventh chord occurred with some frequency." Monteverdi (usually credited as the first to use the V^{7} chord without preparation) and other early Baroque composers begin to treat the V^{7} as a chord as part of the introduction of functional harmony.

An excerpt from Monteverdi's "Lasciatemi Morire", Lamento d'Arianna (1608) is shown below. In it, a dominant seventh chord (in red) is handled conservatively, "prepared and resolved as a suspension, clearly indicating its dissonant status."

The V^{7} was in constant use during the Classical period, with similar treatment to that of the Baroque. In the Romantic period, freer voice-leading was gradually developed, leading to the waning of functional use in the post-Romantic and Impressionistic periods including more dissonant dominant chords through higher extensions and lessened use of the major minor chord's dominant function. Twentieth-century classical music either consciously used functional harmony or was entirely free of V^{7} chords while jazz and popular musics continued to use functional harmony including V^{7} chords.

An excerpt from Chopin's Mazurka in F minor (1849), Op. 68, No. 4, mm. 1–4 is shown below with dominant sevenths in red: "the seventh factor had by this time achieved nearly consonant status."

== Use ==
=== Inversions ===
Inversion	Bottom note	Roman numerals	Macro analysis
Root position	root: 5	V7	in C: G7
First	3rd: 7	V^{6}_{5}	in C: G^{6}_{5}
Second	5th: 2	V^{4}_{3}	in C: G^{4}_{3}
Third	7th: 4	V^{4}_{2} or V^{2}	in C: G^{4}_{2} or G^{2}

Inversions of the Dominant Seventh Chord

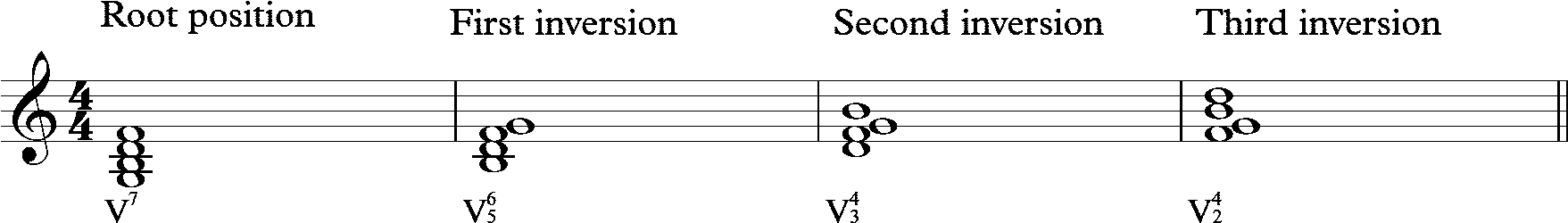
Inversions of the Dominant Seventh Chord

The opening bars of Mozart’s Piano Sonata in C, K545 features dominant seventh chords in both second and first inversions:

Mozart Piano Sonata in C, K545 opening bars

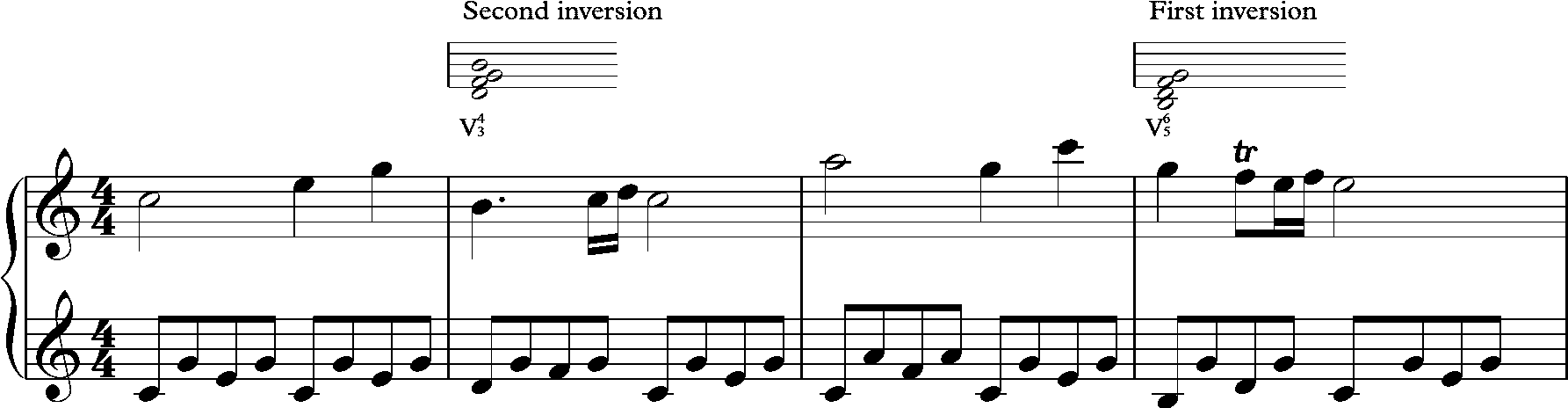
Mozart Piano Sonata in C, K545 opening bars

The concluding cadence of the same movement features the chord in root position:

Mozart Piano Sonata in C, K545, end of first movement

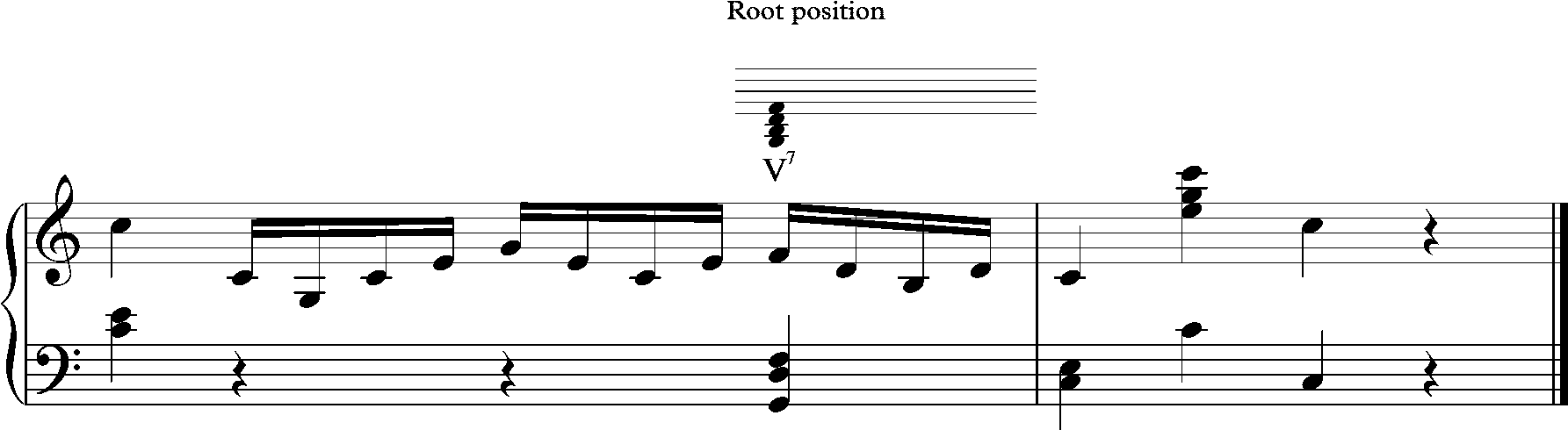
Mozart Piano Sonata in C, K545, end of first movement

A striking use of inversions of the dominant seventh can be found in this passage from the first movement of Beethoven’s String Quartet Op. 127. Here, the second and third inversions contribute to the "magnificently rich harmony":

Beethoven Quartet Op. 127 first movement, bars 135–139

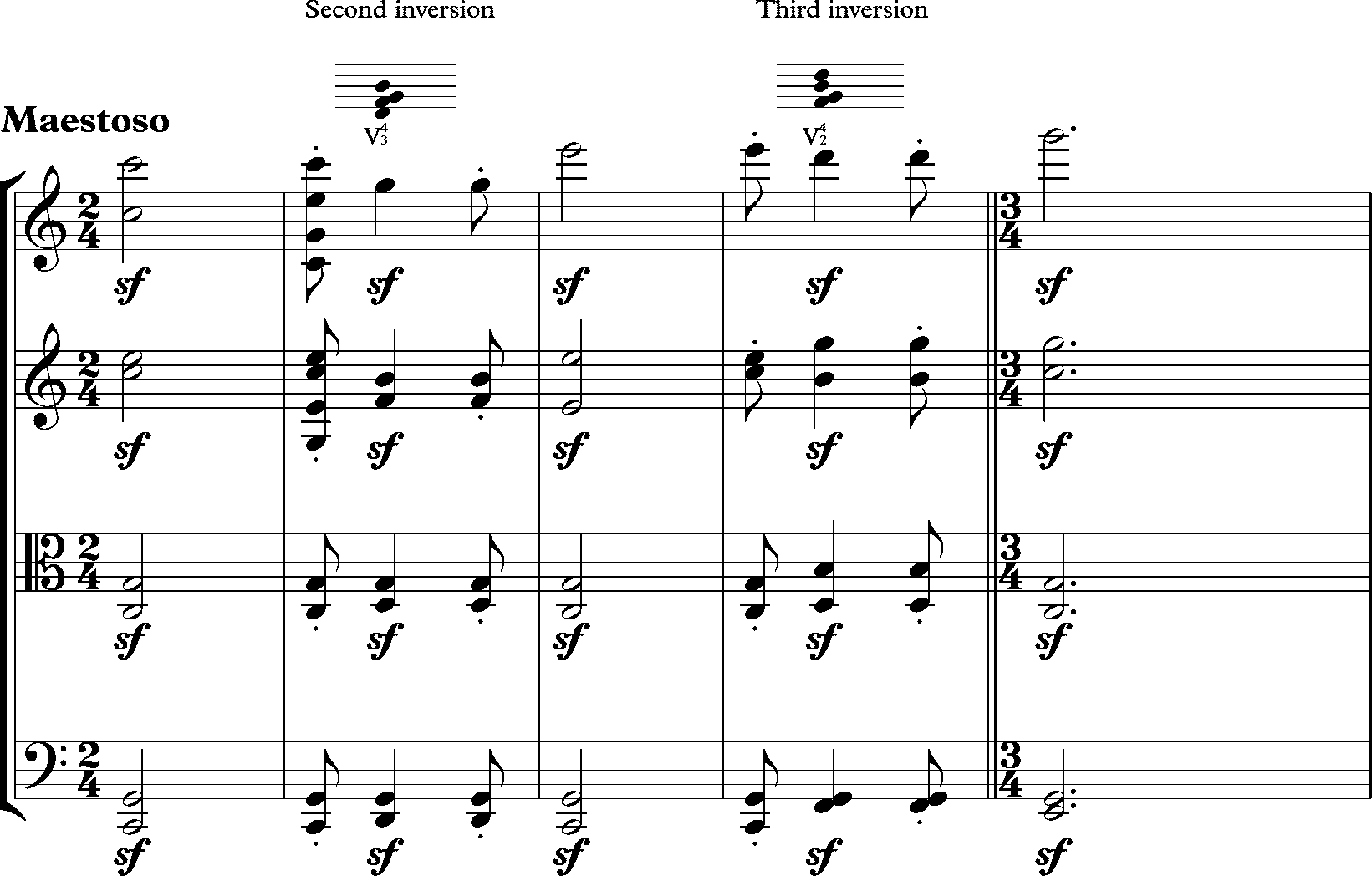
Beethoven Quartet Op. 127 first movement, bars 135–139

=== Function ===
Tritone resolutions in the last measures of Beethoven's Piano Sonata in B♭ major, Op. 22 (1800).

The function of the dominant seventh chord is to resolve to the tonic note or chord.

... the demand of the V^{7} for resolution is, to our ears, almost inescapably compelling. The dominant seventh is, in fact, the central propulsive force in our music; it is unambiguous and unequivocal.

— Goldman, 1965: 35

This dominant seventh chord is useful to composers because it contains both a major triad and the interval of a tritone. The major triad confers a very "strong" sound. The tritone is created by the co-occurrence of the fourth degree and seventh degree (e.g., in the G^{7} chord, the interval between B and F is a tritone).

In a diatonic context, the third of the chord is the leading-tone of the scale, which has a strong tendency to pull towards the tonic of the key (e.g., in C, the third of G^{7}, B, is the leading tone of the key of C). The seventh of the chord acts as an upper leading-tone to the third of the scale (in C: the seventh of G^{7}, F, is a half-step above and leads down to E). This, in combination with the strength of root movement by fifth, and the natural resolution of the dominant triad to the tonic triad (e.g., from GBD to CEG in the key of C major), creates a resolution with which to end a piece or a section, often in a cadence.

Because of this original usage, it also quickly became an easy way to trick the listener's ear with a deceptive cadence. The dominant seventh may work as part of a circle progression, preceded by the supertonic chord, ii.

A non-diatonic dominant seventh chord (sometimes called a chromatic seventh) can be borrowed from another key, and this can provide a way for the composer to modulate to that other key. This technique is extremely common, particularly since the Classical period, and it has led to further innovative uses of the dominant seventh chord such as secondary dominant (V^{7}/V, shown below), extended dominant (V^{7}/V/V), and substitute dominant (♭V^{7}/V) chords.

=== Voice leading ===
For common practice voice leading or "strict resolution" of the dominant seventh chord:

- In the V^{7}–I resolution, the dominant, leading note, and supertonic resolve to the tonic, whereas the subdominant resolves to the mediant.
- In the other resolutions, the dominant remains stationary, the leading note and supertonic resolve to the tonic, and the subdominant resolves to the mediant.
- All four tones may be present, though the root may be doubled and the fifth omitted.
- The diminished fifth (if the seventh is above the third, as in the first measure below) resolves inwards while the augmented fourth (if the seventh is below the third, as in the second measure below) resolves outward. This means that the seventh resolves stepwise downwards while the third resolves upwards to the tonic though in such cases the root of the tonic chord may need to be tripled.
- The root of the V^{7}, when in the bass, resolves to the root of the I, in the bass.
- In an incomplete V^{7}, with a missing fifth, the doubled root remains stationary.
- The "free resolution of the seventh" features the seventh in an inner voice moving stepwise upwards to the fifth of I

According to Heinrich Schenker, "The dissonance is always passing, never a chord member (Zusammenklang),'" and often (though by no means always) the voice leading suggests either a passing note:

8 7 3
5 5 1

or resolution of a (hypothetical) suspension:

(8) 7 3
(4) 5 1

=== In blues progressions ===
In music that follows follow the blues progression, the IV and V chords are "almost always" dominant seventh chords (sometimes with extensions) with the tonic chord most often being a major triad. Examples include Bill Haley and the Comets' "Rock Around the Clock" and Buster Brown's "Fanny Mae", while in Chuck Berry's "Back in the U.S.A." and Loggins and Messina's "Your Mama Don't Dance" the tonic chord is also a dominant seventh. Used mostly in the first fifteen years of the rock era and now sounding somewhat "retrospective" (e.g., Oasis' "Roll With It"), other examples of tonic dominant seventh chords include Little Richard's "Lucille", The Beatles' "I Saw Her Standing There", Nilsson's "Coconut", Jim Croce's "You Don't Mess Around With Jim", and The Drifters' "On Broadway". Chuck Berry's "Rock and Roll Music" uses the dominant seventh on I, IV, and V.

== Related chords ==
The dominant seventh is enharmonically equivalent to the German sixth. For example, the German sixth A♭–C–E♭–F♯ (which typically resolves to G) is equivalent to the dominant seventh A♭–C–E♭–G♭ (which typically resolves to D♭):

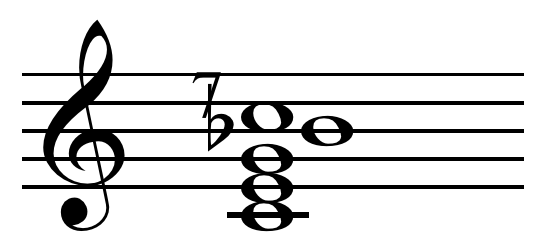
Just harmonic seventh chord on C. 7th: 968.826 cents, a septimal quarter tone lower than B♭.

The dominant seventh chord is frequently used to approximate a harmonic seventh chord, which is one possible just tuning, in the ratios 4:5:6:7, for the dominant seventh. Others include 20:25:30:36, found on I, and 36:45:54:64, found on V, used in 5-limit just tunings and scales.

Today, the dominant seventh chord enjoys particular prominence in the music of barbershop quartets, with the Barbershop Harmony Society describing the chord as the "signature" of the barbershop sound. A song may use the chord type (built on any scale degree, not just), for up to 30 percent of its duration. As barbershop singers strive to harmonize in just intonation to maximize the audibility of harmonic overtones, the practical sonority of the chord tends to be that of a harmonic seventh chord. This chord type has become so ingrained into the fabric of the artform that it is often referred to as the "barbershop seventh chord" by those who practice it.

== Tuning ==
Chord	Notation	Seventh	Ratios
Tonic seventh chord	C E G B♭	Minor seventh	20:25:30:36
Harmonic seventh chord	G B D F+	Harmonic seventh	4:5:6:7
German sixth chord	A♭ C E♭ G♭	Harmonic seventh	4:5:6:7
Dominant seventh chord	G B D F	Pythagorean minor seventh	36:45:54:64

== Dominant seventh chord table ==
Chord	Root	Major third	Perfect fifth	Minor seventh
C^{7}	C	E	G	B♭
C♯^{7}	C♯	E♯ (F)	G♯	B
D♭^{7}	D♭	F	A♭	C♭ (B)
D^{7}	D	F♯	A	C
D♯^{7}	D♯	F (G)	A♯	C♯
E♭^{7}	E♭	G	B♭	D♭
E^{7}	E	G♯	B	D
F^{7}	F	A	C	E♭
F♯^{7}	F♯	A♯	C♯	E
G♭^{7}	G♭	B♭	D♭	F♭ (E)
G^{7}	G	B	D	F
G♯^{7}	G♯	B♯ (C)	D♯	F♯
A♭^{7}	A♭	C	E♭	G♭
A^{7}	A	C♯	E	G
A♯^{7}	A♯	C (D)	E♯ (F)	G♯
B♭^{7}	B♭	D	F	A♭
B^{7}	B	D♯	F♯	A

== See also ==
- Irregular resolution
- Nondominant seventh chord
- Subtonic
- Mixolydian mode
