= Tag (barbershop music) =

Last line(s) of a song's chorus

In barbershop music, a tag is a dramatic variation put in the last section of the song. It is roughly analogous to a coda in classical music.

Tags are characterized by heightening the dramatic tension of the song, frequently including a hanger or sustained note against which the other singers carry the rhythm. In addition, good tags can be sung as short, stand-alone works. Tags may be soft and tender or characterized by loud, "paint-peeling", ringing chords.

== Hanger ==
A hanger, or a post, in barbershop music is a long note, held by one of the voices in the quartet, while the other voices are free to change notes, and even breathe (pedal point). Hangers usually occur in the tag of a Barbershop song, although they may occur anywhere. The held note is typically the tonic note of the song (e.g. if the song is in G Major, the hanger is usually a G). Any one of the four voices can have the hanger, although the hanger is typically a high note, therefore it is usually assigned to either the Lead or Tenor (inverted pedal point or internal pedal point).

Some barbershop arrangements have elaborate tags featuring a long hanger which is usually sung at a high volume (fortissimo in musical terminology). Advanced singers in barbershop quartets at the highest level of competition can sing hangers upward of 20 seconds long. The combination of the one note, held long and loud, and the other three voices singing various creative harmonies around that one note, is popular among barbershop music enthusiasts.

Singing a hanger is also referred to as posting a note.
