= Resolution (music) =

Musical change from dissonance to consonance

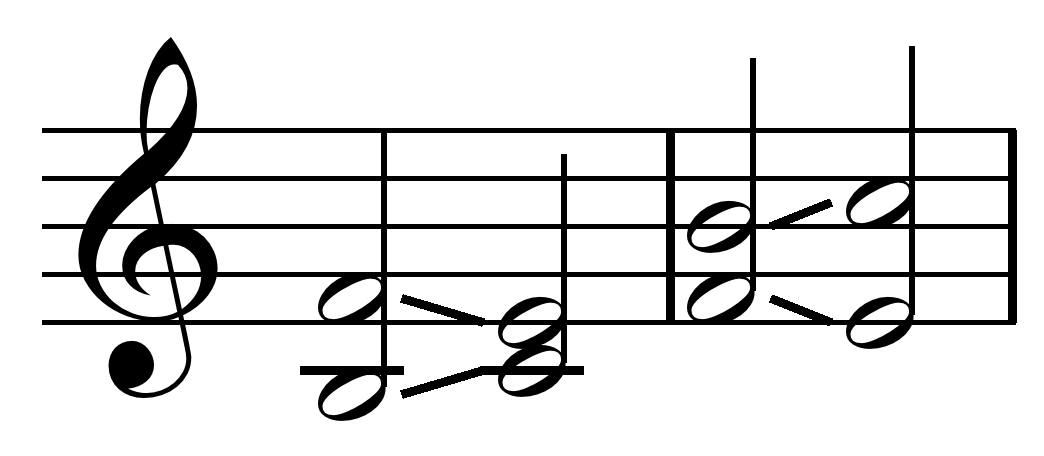
Dominant seventh tritone "strict resolution" (in C): a dissonance of a d5 resolves stepwise inwards to a consonance of a M3 or its inversion, a dissonance of an A4, resolves stepwise outwards to a consonance of a m6. or outward

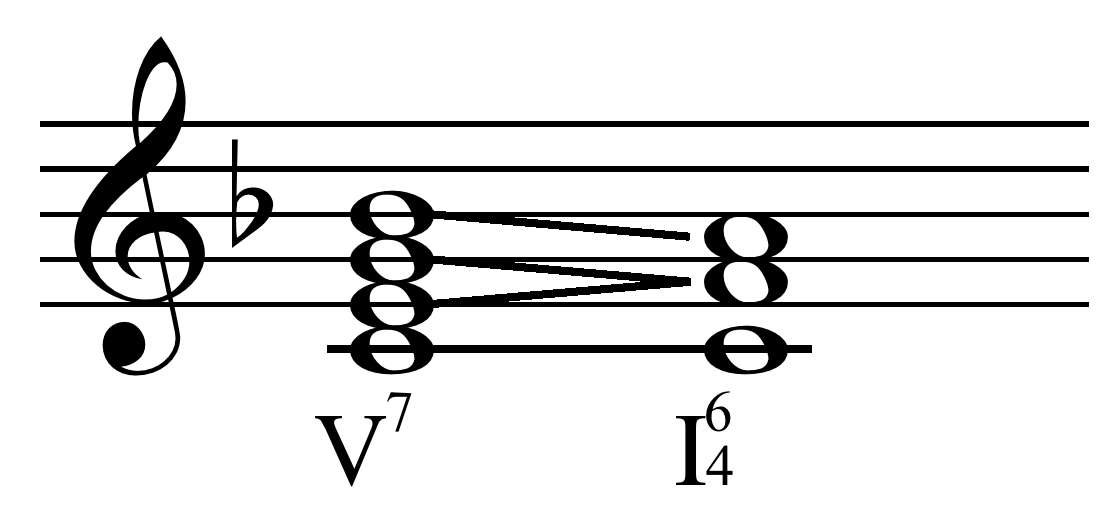
Regular resolution in F major. One common tone, two notes move by half step motion, and one note moves by whole step motion.

Resolution in Western tonal music theory is the move of a note or chord from dissonance (an unstable sound) to a consonance (a more final or stable sounding one).

Dissonance, resolution, and suspense can be used to create musical interest. Where a melody or chordal pattern is expected to resolve to a certain note or chord, a different but similarly suitable note can be resolved to instead, creating an interesting and unexpected sound. For example, the deceptive cadence.

== Basis ==
A dissonance has its resolution when it moves to a consonance. When a resolution is delayed or is accomplished in surprising ways—when the composer plays with our sense of expectation—a feeling of drama or suspense is created.

— Roger Kamien (2008), p.41

Dominant seventh resolutions in the last measures of Beethoven's Piano Sonata in B♭ major, Op. 22 (1800).

Resolution has a strong basis in tonal music, since atonal music generally contains a more constant level of dissonance and lacks a tonal center to which to resolve.

The concept of "resolution", and the degree to which resolution is "expected", is contextual as to culture and historical period. In a classical piece of the Baroque period, for example, an added sixth chord (made up of the notes C, E, G and A, for example) has a very strong need to resolve, while in a more modern work, that need is less strong - in the context of a pop or jazz piece, such a chord could comfortably end a piece and have no particular need to resolve.

== Example ==
An example of a single dissonant note which requires resolution would be, for instance, an F during a C major chord, C–E–G, which creates a dissonance with both E and G and may resolve to either, though more usually to E (the closer pitch). This is an example of a suspended chord. In reference to chords and progressions for example, a phrase ending with the following cadence IV–V, a half cadence, does not have a high degree of resolution. However, if this cadence were changed to (IV–)V–I, an authentic cadence, it would resolve much more strongly by ending on the tonic I chord.

== See also ==
- Circle of fifths
- Corelli clash
- Irregular resolution
- Lipps–Meyer law
- Doubling (music)
