= Seventh chord =

Musical chord

The dominant seventh chord on C

A seventh chord is a chord consisting of a triad plus a note forming an interval of a seventh above the chord's root. When not otherwise specified, a "seventh chord" usually means a dominant seventh chord: a major triad together with a minor seventh. However, a variety of sevenths may be added to a variety of triads, resulting in many different types of seventh chords.

In its earliest usage, the seventh was introduced solely as an embellishing or nonchord tone. The seventh destabilized the triad, and allowed the composer to emphasize movement in a given direction. As time passed and the collective ear of the western world became more accustomed to dissonance, the seventh was allowed to become a part of the chord itself, and in some modern music, especially in genres like jazz, seventh chords can be found very commonly within compositions. Additionally, the general acceptance of equal temperament during the 19th century reduced the dissonance of some earlier forms of sevenths.

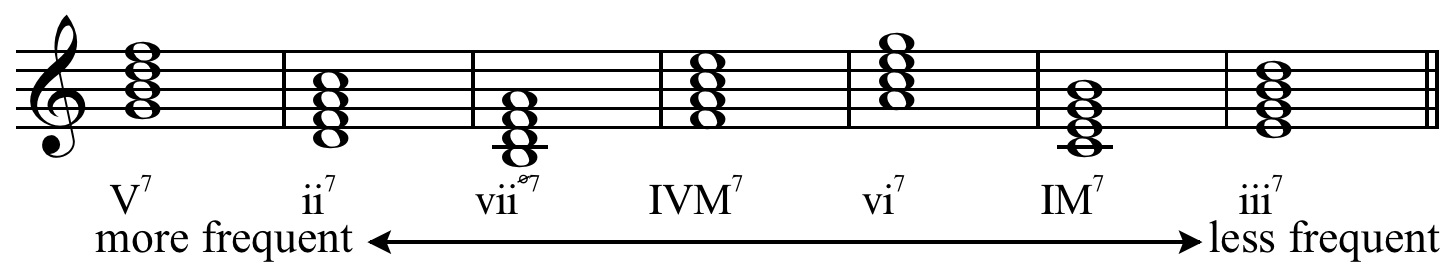
"A ranking by frequency of the seventh chords in C major would be approximately that shown." (Dominant), ii^{7} (Minor), vii^{ø}^{7} (Half-diminished), IVM^{7} (Major), vi^{7}, IM^{7}, or iii^{7}

== Classification ==
Most textbooks name these chords formally by the type of triad and type of seventh; hence, a chord consisting of a major triad and a minor seventh above the root is referred to as a major/minor seventh chord. When the triad type and seventh type are identical (i.e. they are both major, minor, or diminished), the name is shortened. For instance, a major/major seventh is generally referred to as a major seventh. This rule is not valid for augmented chords: since the augmented/augmented chord is not commonly used, the abbreviation augmented is used for augmented/minor, rather than augmented/augmented. Additionally, half-diminished stands for diminished/minor, and dominant stands for major/minor. When the type is not specified at all, the triad is assumed to be major, and the seventh is understood as a minor seventh (e.g. a "C" chord is a "C major triad", and a "C^{7}" chord is a "C major/minor seventh chord", also known as a "C dominant seventh chord"). For symbols used for seventh chords, see also Popular music symbols § Seventh chords.

=== Tertian ===
The most common chords are tertian, constructed using a sequence of major thirds (spanning 4 semitones) and/or minor thirds (3 semitones). Since there are 3 third intervals in a seventh chord (4 notes) and each can be major or minor, there are 7 possible permutations (the 8th one, consisted of four major thirds, results in a non-seventh augmented chord, since a major third equally divides the octave). The five commonly found in western music are the major seventh, the minor (or minor/minor) seventh, the dominant (or major/minor) seventh, the half-diminished seventh, and the diminished seventh. The less commonly found tertians are the minor major seventh and the augmented major seventh.

Tertian seventh chords used in Western music
Common name	Chord on C	Common symbols on C	Intervals from root			Quality of consecutive thirds		
Common name	Chord on C	Common symbols on C	Third	Fifth	Seventh	1st	2nd	3rd
Major seventh		Cmaj^{7} CM^{7} C^{Δ7} C^{Δ}	major	perfect	major	major	minor	major
Minor seventh		Cmin^{7} Cm^{7} C−^{7}	minor	perfect	minor	minor	major	minor
Dominant seventh		C^{7}	major	perfect	minor	major	minor	minor
Half-diminished seventh		Cm^{7♭5} C−^{7♭5} C^{ø}^{7}	minor	diminished	minor	minor	minor	major
Diminished seventh		C^{o}^{7} Cdim^{7} Cm^{(♭7)♭5} C−^{(♭7)♭5}	minor	diminished	diminished	minor	minor	minor
Minor major seventh		Cm^{maj7} Cm^{M7} Cm^{Δ7} C−^{Δ7}	minor	perfect	major	minor	major	major
Augmented major seventh		Caug^{maj7} C+^{maj7} C+^{M7} C+^{Δ7}	major	augmented	major	major	major	minor

=== Non-tertian ===
Seventh chords can also be constructed using augmented or diminished thirds. These chords are not tertian and can be used in non-tertian harmony. There are many (mathematically, 64) chords that can be built, however, only a few of them are used in Western music.

Commonly used non-tertian seventh chords
Common name	Chord on C	Common symbols on C	Intervals from root			Quality of consecutive thirds		
Common name	Chord on C	Common symbols on C	Third	Fifth	Seventh	1st	2nd	3rd
Augmented seventh		Caug^{7} C+^{7}	major	augmented	minor	major	major	diminished (equiv. major second)
Diminished major seventh		Cm^{M7♭5} C−^{Δ7♭5}	minor	diminished	major	minor	minor	augmented (equiv. perfect fourth)
Dominant seventh flat five		C^{7♭5}	major	diminished	minor	major	diminished	major
Major seventh flat five		C^{M7♭5}	major	diminished	major	major	diminished	augmented

In tuning systems other than equal temperament there are further possible seventh chords. In just intonation, for example, there is the harmonic seventh.

== Types ==
=== Dominant seventh chord ===
The dominant seventh chord (V^{7}) in C major, G^{7}

A dominant seventh chord, or major-minor seventh chord is a chord composed of a root, major third, perfect fifth -- a major triad -- with an additional minor seventh. It is denoted using popular music symbols by adding a superscript "7" after the letter designating the chord root. The dominant seventh is found almost as often as the dominant triad. The chord can be represented by the integer notation (0, 4, 7, 10).

Of all the seventh chords, perhaps the most important is the dominant seventh. It was the first seventh chord to appear regularly in classical music. The name comes from the fact that the flat seventh occurs naturally in the scale built upon the root when it functions as the dominant (i.e., the fifth degree) of some major diatonic scale.

Take for example the C major scale (C, D, E, F, G, A, B, C):

The note G is the dominant degree of C major—its fifth note. When we arrange the notes of the C major scale in ascending pitch and use only these notes to build a seventh chord, and we start with G (not C), then the resulting chord contains the four notes G–B–D–F and is called G dominant seventh (G^{7}). The note F is a minor seventh from G, and is also called the dominant seventh with respect to G.

=== Harmonic seventh chord ===
The harmonic seventh chord on C

The harmonic seventh chord is a dominant seventh chord formed by a major triad plus a harmonic seventh interval.

The harmonic seventh interval is a minor seventh tuned in the 7:4 pitch ratio, one of the possible "just ratios" defined for this interval in just intonation (slightly below the width of a minor seventh as tuned in equal temperament). With just intonation on all notes of the harmonic seventh chord, the ratio between the frequencies of the pitches in the chord is 4:5:6:7. For example, a justly intuned A harmonic seventh chord in root position starting at A440 consists of the pitches 440 Hz, 550 Hz, 660 Hz, and 770 Hz.

Sometimes called a "blue note", the harmonic seventh is used by singers, through note bending on guitars, and on other instruments not restricted to equal temperament. An often heard example of the harmonic seventh chord is the last word of the modern addition to the song "Happy Birthday to You", with the lyrics, "and many more!" The harmony on the word "more" is typically sung as a harmonic seventh chord.

Frequent use of the harmonic seventh chord is one of the defining characteristics of blues and barbershop harmony; barbershoppers refer to it as "the barbershop seventh". Since barbershop music tends to be sung in just intonation, the barbershop seventh chord may be accurately termed a harmonic seventh chord. The harmonic seventh chord is also widely used in blues-flavored music. As pianos, and other equal-temperament instruments cannot play this chord, it is frequently approximated by a dominant seventh. As a result, it is often called a dominant seventh chord and written with the same symbols (such as the blues progression I^{7}–V^{7}–IV^{7}).

=== Major and minor seventh chords ===
The minor seventh chord (ii^{7}) in C major, D–^{7}

While the dominant seventh chord is typically built on the fifth (or dominant) degree of a major scale, the minor seventh chord is built on the second, third, or sixth degree. A minor seventh chord contains the same notes as an added sixth chord. For example, C–E♭–G–B♭ can function as both a C minor seventh and an E♭ added sixth (Id chord).

The major seventh chord (IV^{7}) in C major, FΔ^{7}

Major seventh chords are usually constructed on the first or fourth degree of a scale, (in C or G major: C–E–G–B). Due to the major seventh interval between the root and seventh (C–B, an inverted minor second), this chord can sometimes sound dissonant, depending on the voicing used. For example, Bacharach and David's "Raindrops Keep Fallin' on My Head" opens with a major chord followed by a major seventh in the next measure.

The major seventh is sometimes notated as Δ7 (a delta chord) or just a Δ (which has the same meaning).

=== Half-diminished seventh chord ===
The leading-tone seventh chord (vii^{ø}^{7}) in C major, B^{ø}^{7}

A half-diminished seventh chord is a seventh chord built from the seventh degree of a major scale. It is considered "half-diminished" because a fully diminished seventh has a double-flatted (diminished) seventh, making it enharmonically the same as a major sixth. The half-diminished seventh chord uses a minor seventh over the root of a diminished triad.

Example: (in the key of C major) B–D–F–A.

=== Diminished seventh chord ===
The diminished seventh chord on B

A diminished seventh chord is made of three superimposed minor thirds (e.g., B–D–F–A♭), which is two tritones a minor third apart (e.g., B–F, D–A♭). The diminished seventh chord has been used by composers and musicians for a variety of reasons over time. Some reasons include: as a symbol of Sturm und Drang; modulation; and for characterisation. The diminished seventh chord is seen more frequently in late classical and romantic period works but is also found in Baroque and Renaissance period works, though not as frequently.

All of the elements of the diminished seventh chord can be found in the dominant seventh flat nine (7♭9) chord as seen in a comparison of the two chords.

== Inversions ==
There are four different inversions of a seventh chord. Following basso continuo notation, the inversions are as follows:

- V^{7}: GBDF
- V^{6}_{5}: BDFG
- V^{4}_{3}: DFGB
- V^{2} or ^{4}_{2}: FGBD

Additional numbers are used to indicate the seventh chords and their inversions.

== See also ==
- Dominant seventh flat five chord
- Diminished major seventh chord
- Diminished minor seventh chord
- Augmented major seventh chord
- Augmented minor seventh chord
