= Septimal quarter tone =

Septimal quarter tone approximated by 24-tet

Septimal quarter tone on C

Just minor third on C

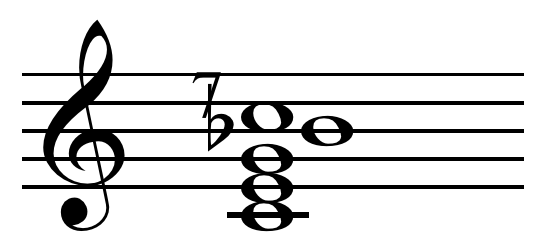
Just harmonic seventh chord on C

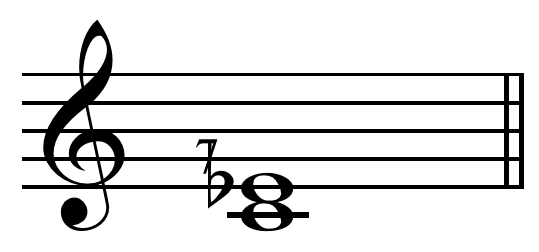
Septimal minor third on C

A septimal quarter tone (in music) is an interval with the ratio of 36:35, which is the difference between the septimal minor third and the Just minor third, or about 48.77 cents wide. The name derives from the interval being the 7-limit approximation of a quarter tone. The septimal quarter tone can be viewed either as a musical interval in its own right, or as a comma; if it is tempered out in a given tuning system, the distinction between the two different types of minor thirds is lost. The septimal quarter tone may be derived from the harmonic series as the interval between the thirty-fifth and thirty-sixth harmonics.

Composer Ben Johnston uses a small seven ("") as an accidental to indicate a note is lowered by 36/35 (≈49 cents), or an upside-down seven ("") to indicate a note is raised by the same amount. The Maneri-Sims notation system designed for 72-et uses the accidentals and for a quarter tone (36:35 or 48.77 cents) up and down.

The septimal quarter tone is tempered out by twelve-tone equal temperament, but not in any of 19-TET, 22-TET, 24-TET, or 31-TET. 22-TET and 24-TET offer a very close match to the septimal quarter tone.

The septimal quarter tone is the difference between the 9:5 just minor seventh and the harmonic seventh.
