= Chamber Symphony No. 2 (Schoenberg) =

Composition by Arnold Schoenberg

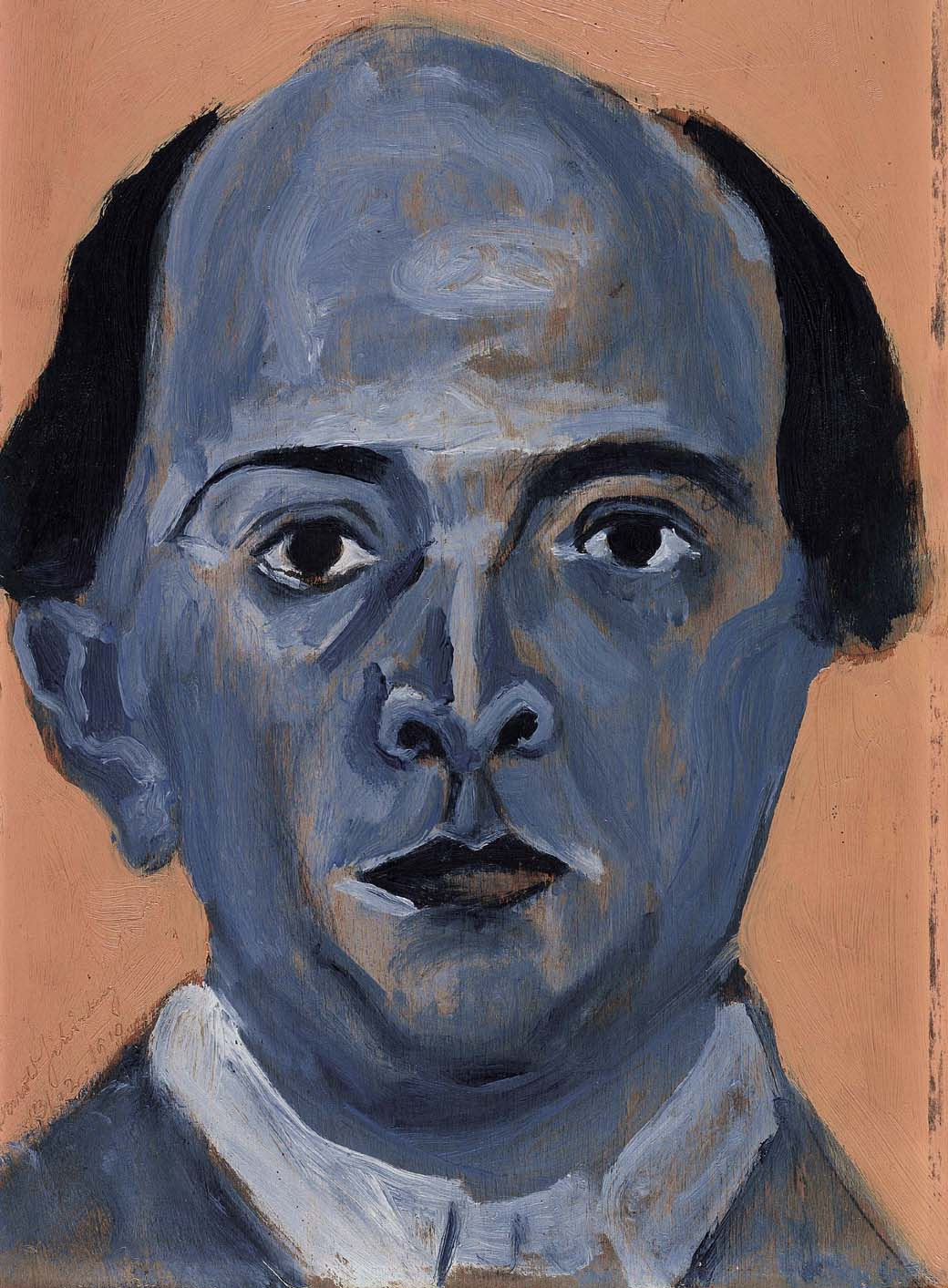
A 1910 self-portrait of Arnold Schoenberg

Chamber Symphony No. 2, Op. 38, by Arnold Schoenberg was begun in 1906 and completed in 1939. The work's belated completion was prompted by the conductor Fritz Stiedry, who asked Schoenberg for an orchestral piece for his New Friends of Music Orchestra in New York. The work was first performed there on December 14, 1940, under Stiedry's direction.

== Background ==
When Schoenberg began the work in 1906, he was on the verge of a major stylistic change. His Chamber Symphony No. 1, for 15 players, has a concise form in which the four movements of a traditional symphony are condensed into a single larger one and establishes the soloistic orchestral writing sporadically found in works such as Gurre-Lieder and Pelleas und Melisande. After completing it, Schoenberg thought he had reached his mature style, but he soon began to explore new avenues of expression.

The Second Chamber Symphony was begun shortly after the first was completed, but despite several efforts (in 1911 and again in 1916), Schoenberg was unable to bring it to a satisfactory conclusion. When he returned to the work 33 years later, it was likely because he felt that his earlier style retained unexplored possibilities. In a letter to Stiedry, Schoenberg addressed the problem of returning to his past:

For a month I have been working on the Second Chamber Symphony. I spend most of the time trying to find out ‘What was the author getting at here? Indeed, my style has greatly deepened meanwhile, and I find it hard to reconcile what I then rightly wrote, trusting my sense of form and not thinking too much, with my current extensive demands in respect of ‘visible’ logic. Today that is one of the major difficulties, for it also affects the material.

In 1939, he added 20 bars to the original first movement, wrote the latter half of the second movement, and revised and reorchestrated the earlier portions of the work. He considered adding a third movement, an Adagio, and sketched out 127 bars of it but then decided that the work's musical and ‘psychic’ problems had already been presented thoroughly in the first two movements. He also expanded the ensemble to that of a classical-sized orchestra, with the available forces of Stiedry's orchestra in mind.

Compared to the 1906 version, the 1939 version demonstrates greater variety between the string, woodwind and brass sections of the orchestra, using distinct instrumental groupings in a style similar to that of Anton Bruckner. It avoids the doubling of instrumental lines in favor of a differentiation of individual parts, showing that Schoenberg’s later style placed greater emphasis on clarity of textures than did his earlier orchestral scores. In almost every instance in the 1906 draft, first violins are paired with flute, oboe I, and clarinet I, second violins are paired with second clarinet, and lower strings are paired with octave doublings.

== Music ==
The work is scored for two flutes (2nd doubling piccolo), two oboes (2nd doubling cor anglais), two clarinets, two bassoons, two horns, two trumpets and strings.

The chamber symphony are two movements:

1. Adagio (E♭ minor)
2. Con fuoco – Lento (G major)

Harmonically, the Second Chamber Symphony generally progresses by stepwise motion, juxtaposing the First Chamber Symphony’s forward movement through non-traditional suspensions and appoggiaturas. Schoenberg combined this tonal style with fourth chords and similar combinations to grave and severe effect. While the First Chamber Symphony attempts to expand the limits of tonality, the second does not constantly attempt to undermine tonal references.

There is debate over what prompted Schoenberg to readmit tonality in pieces such as the Second Chamber Symphony, but his own words are probably the most telling. In his 1948 essay "On revient toujours", he wrote:

I was not destined to continue in the manner of Transfigured Night or Gurre-Lieder or even Pelleas and Melisande. The Supreme Commander had ordered me on a harder road. But a longing to return to the older style was always vigorous in me, and from time to time I had to yield to that urge.
