= Fragmentation (music) =

In music composition, fragmentation is the use of fragments or the "division of a musical idea (gesture, motive, theme, etc.) into segments". It is used in tonal and atonal music, and is a common method of localized development and closure.

Fragmentation is related to Arnold Schoenberg's concept of liquidation, a common compositional technique that describes the reduction of a large-scale musical idea to its essential form (e.g., a contour line, a specific harmonic motion). Liquidation shapes much thematically-driven music, such as that by Béla Bartók, Stravinsky, and Schoenberg himself.

== Liquidation ==
Schoenberg's liquidation technique breaks a subject down into constituent motivic elements, gradually neutralizing or dissolving distinctive features. These reduced elements are then reorganized and transformed into new themes and motives, continually reshaping musical material while preserving underlying motivic connections. The process also links surface-level motivic–thematic development to harmonic structure, which Schoenberg defined through pitch collections and their relationships via common tones and pitch classes.

== See also ==
- Function (music)
- Musical argument
- Musical form
- Organic unity
- Patricia Carpenter (music theorist)
- Schenkerian analysis
- Riemannian theory
- Structure
- Twelve-tone technique

== Bibliography ==
- Babbitt, Milton (1987). "The Twelve-Tone Tradition". In Dembski, Stephen; Straus, Joseph N. (eds.). Words About Music: The Madison Lectures. Madison, Wisconsin: University of Wisconsin Press. ISBN 978-0-299-10794-9.
