= Fritz Stiedry =

Austrian conductor and composer

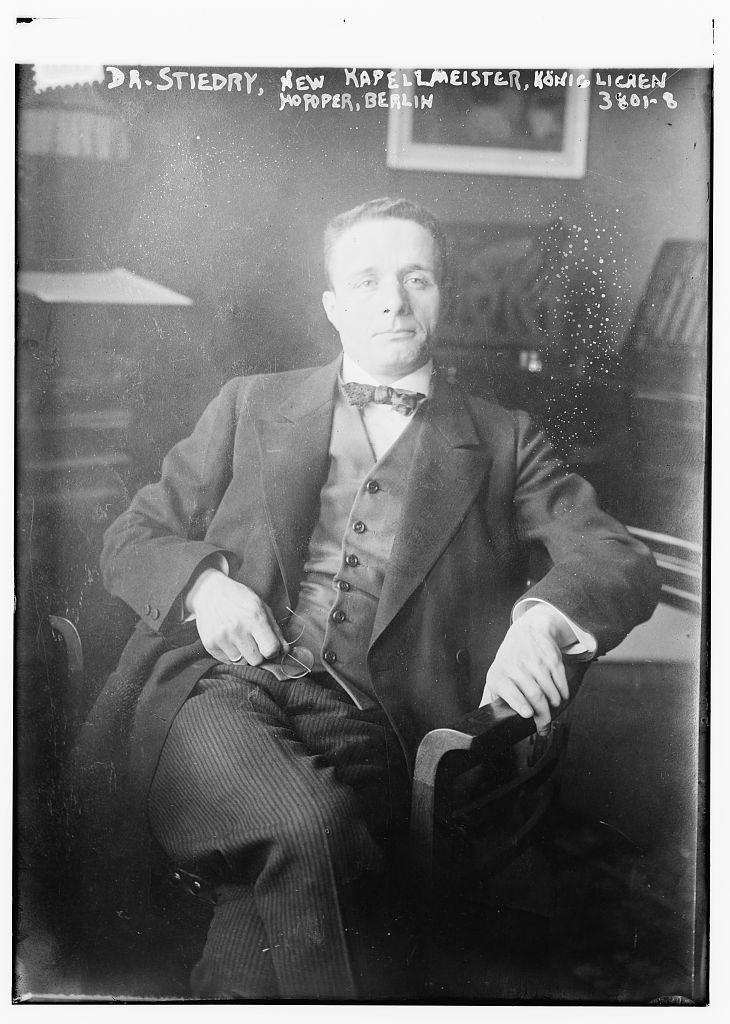
Fritz Stiedry circa 1915 in Berlin

Fritz Stiedry (11 October 1883 – 8 August 1968) was an Austrian conductor and composer.

== Biography ==
Fritz Stiedry was born in Vienna in 1883. While still a law student at the University of Vienna, Stiedry's talent for music was noticed by Gustav Mahler, who appointed him his assistant at the Vienna Court Opera in 1907. This was followed by other assistant posts, leading to chief conductorships at the operas of Kassel and Berlin. In 1932 he conducted the world premiere of Kurt Weill's opera Die Bürgschaft.

Stiedry left Germany when Adolf Hitler came to power in 1933, and from 1934 to 1937 was principal conductor of the Leningrad Philharmonic Orchestra. He was involved in rehearsals for the premiere of Shostakovich's Fourth Symphony until the premiere was canceled for reasons, in all probability political, that remain controversial. Some claim that Shostakovich felt Stiedry was unable to deal with the symphony's complexities, but others maintain that the real reason was that Communist Party officials pressured the composer to withdraw the work.

In 1937, Stiedry left Leningrad for the United States and the New Friends of Music Orchestra in New York, conducting long-neglected works by Bach, Haydn and Mozart and premiering Schoenberg's Second Chamber Symphony. From 1945 onwards he returned to opera, conducting the Lyric Opera of Chicago and the Metropolitan Opera of New York and co-founding the Hunter College Opera Workshop.

He died in Zürich, Switzerland in 1968, aged 84.

He recorded Haydn's symphonies nos. 67, 80, 99 and 102. His live recording from the Metropolitan Opera of Giuseppe Verdi's La forza del destino (omitting the Act I inn scene, as customary there in the 1950s under Rudolf Bing) has been transferred to CD.

== Works ==
- Der gerettete Alkibiades, opera
- chamber music

== Literature ==
- Holmes, John L. Conductors on record, Victor Gollancz, 1982.
- Handbuch österreichischer Autorinnen und Autoren jüdischer Herkunft 18. bis 20. Jahrhundert. Vol. 3, S-Z. Ed. Österreichische Nationalbibliothek Wien. K. G. Saur, 2002, ISBN 3-598-11545-8, p. 1328.
- Sadie, Stanley. The new Grove Dictionary of Music and Musicians, Macmillan, 1980.
- Lyman, Darryl. Great Jews in Music, J. D. Publishers, 1986.
- Sadie, Stanley; Hitchcock, H. Wiley (Ed.). The New Grove Dictionary of American Music. Grove's Dictionaries of Music, 1986.
- Myers, Kurtz. Index to record reviews 1984–1987, G.K. Hall, 1989.
- Pâris, Alain. Dictionnaire des interpretes et de l'interpretation musicale au XX siecle, Robert Laffont, 1989.

Cultural offices
Preceded by Aleksandr Gauk	Musical Director, Leningrad Philharmonic Orchestra; 1934–1937	Succeeded by Yevgeny Mravinsky
