= Violin Concerto (Schoenberg) =

1936 violin concerto by Arnold Schoenberg

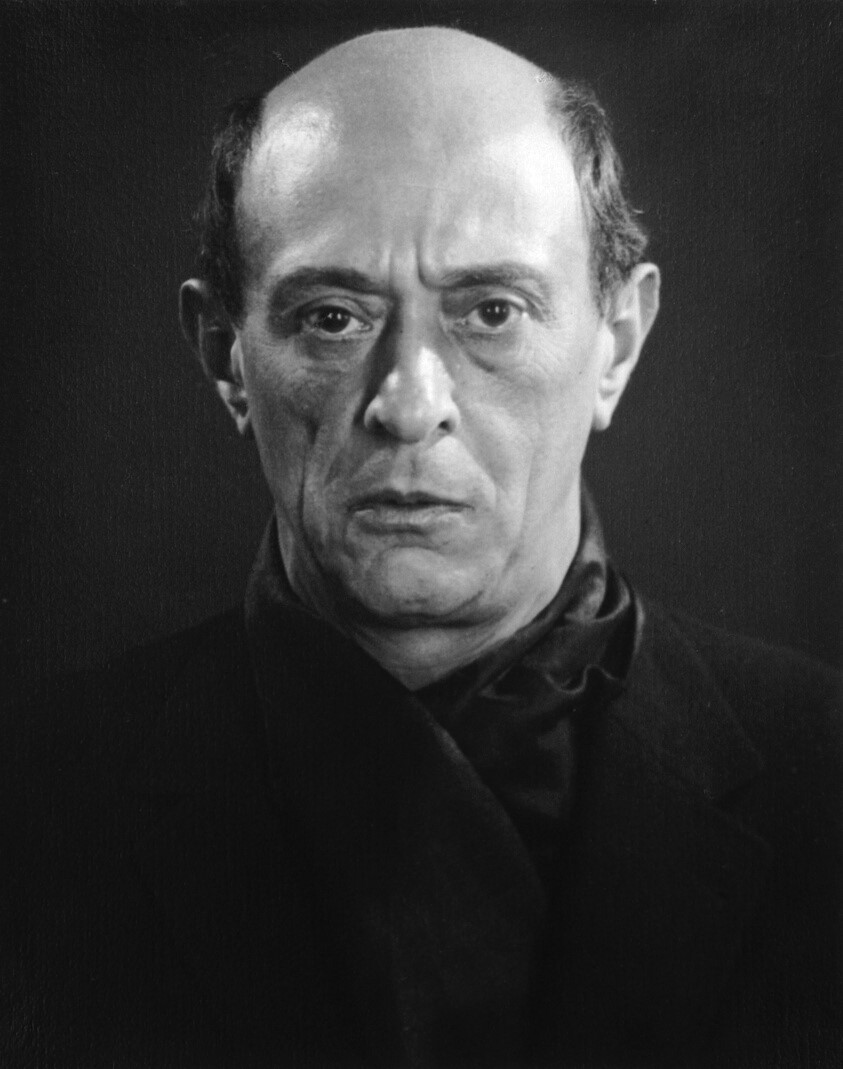
Arnold Schoenberg in 1927

The Violin Concerto, Op. 36, by Arnold Schoenberg dates from Schoenberg's time in the United States, where he had moved in 1933 to escape Nazi Germany. The piece was written in 1936, the same year as the String Quartet No. 4. At the time of its completion, Schoenberg was living in Brentwood, Los Angeles, and had just accepted a teaching position at the University of California, Los Angeles. The work is dedicated to Anton Webern.

The concerto was first published in 1939 by G. Schirmer.

== Premiere ==
The concerto was premiered on December 6, 1940, by the Philadelphia Orchestra conducted by Leopold Stokowski with Louis Krasner as the soloist (Krasner had previously given the premiere of the Violin Concerto by Schoenberg's pupil, Alban Berg). Krasner later made a recording of the concerto, with Dimitri Mitropoulos and the New York Philharmonic.

Teatro La Fenice, 6 September 1948 (XI Festival internazionale di musica contemporanea, Primo concerto sinfonico). Arrigo Pelliccia, violin; Orchestra Sinfonica di Roma della Radio Italiana, Artur Rodziński, conductor.

== Music ==
Schoenberg had made a return to tonal writing upon his move to America and, though the Violin Concerto uses twelve-tone technique, its neoclassical form demanded a mimesis of tonal melody, and hence a renunciation of the motivic technique used in his earlier work in favour of a thematic structure. The basic row of the concerto is:

While the row is not necessary for understanding any good twelve-note piece, an awareness of it in this concerto is useful because the row is very much in the foreground, and is quite obviously abstracted from Schoenberg's concrete melodic-thematic thinking.

It is in a three movement fast–slow–fast form, traditional for concertos:

1. Poco allegro — Vivace
2. Andante grazioso
3. Finale: Allegro

Opinion is divided about the form of the first movement. According to one authority, it is in sonata form, while another asserts it is a large ternary form, concluding with a cadenza and a coda. It employs a wide variety of row forms, often in families associated by hexachordal content.

The last movement is a rondo with an unusually dynamic development. It only gradually becomes clear that the underlying character is that of a march. There is a second cadenza just before the end, which rounds off the whole work in cyclic fashion.

=== Instrumentation ===
The orchestra calls for 3 flutes (3rd doubling piccolo), 3 oboes, piccolo clarinet, clarinet, bass clarinet, 3 bassoons, 4 horns, 3 trumpets, 3 trombones, tuba, timpani, glockenspiel, xylophone, bass drum, cymbals, tamtam, snare drum, triangle, tambourine, and strings.
