= Arnold Schoenberg =

Austrian-American composer (1874–1951)

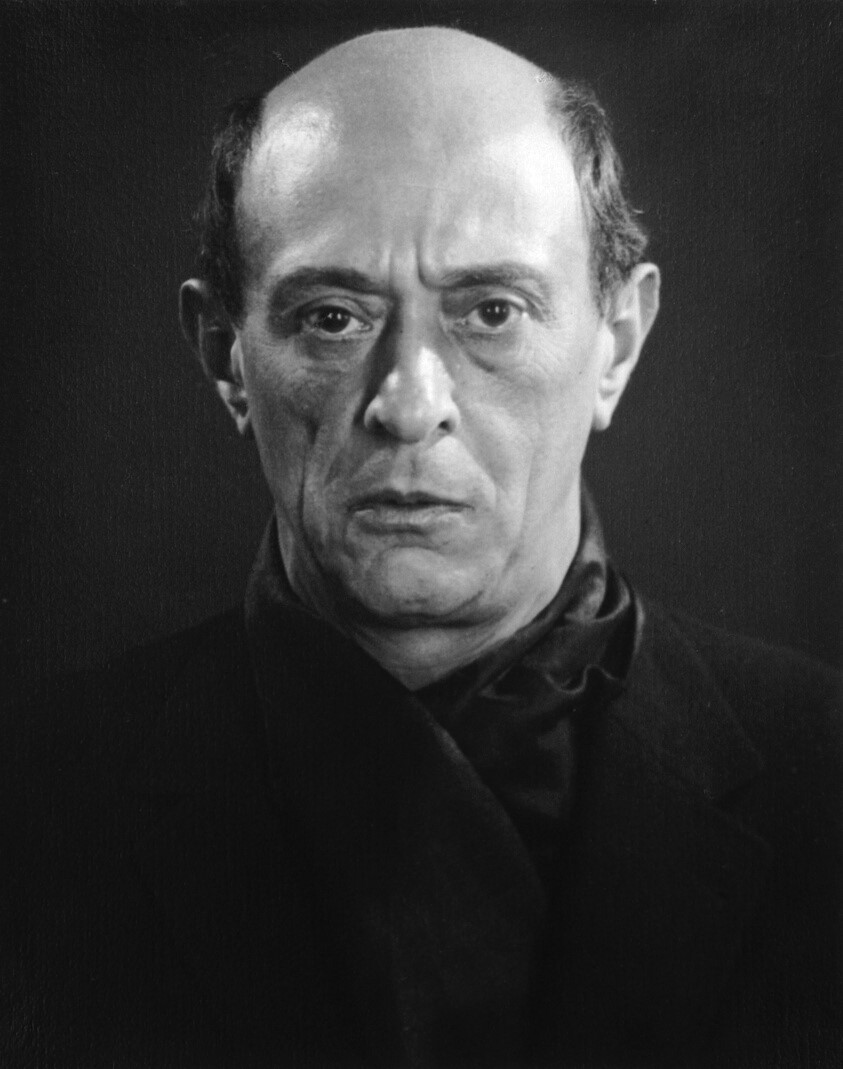
- Schoenberg in 1927
- Born: 13 September 1874; Vienna, Austria-Hungary
- Died: 13 July 1951 (aged 76); Los Angeles, California
- Occupations: Composer; music theorist; teacher
- Known for: Second Viennese School
- Works: List of compositions

Arnold Schoenberg or Schönberg (Note: /ˈʃɜːrnbɜːrɡ/ SHURN-burg, US also /ˈʃoʊn-/ SHOHN-; German: [ˈʃøːnbɛɐ̯k]) (13 September 1874 – 13 July 1951) was an Austrian and American modernist composer, music theorist, and teacher associated with developing variation, the emancipation of the dissonance, and twelve-tone composition. He taught composition in Vienna and at the Prussian Academy of Arts (1925–1933), resigning in anticipation of Nazi Germany's civil–service restrictions. He defiantly reaffirmed his Judaism before immigrating to the United States, where he taught at the University of California, Los Angeles (1936–1944).

Early works like Verklärte Nacht (1899) and Gurre-Lieder (1900–1903, orch. 1910–1911) represented a synthesis of Johannes Brahms and Richard Wagner, while Richard Strauss influenced Pelleas und Melisande (1902–1903). Schoenberg mentored Anton Webern and Alban Berg, among others tied to the Second Viennese School, (Note: Among his many other students were Egon Wellesz, Hanns Eisler, Robert Gerhard, and Nikos Skalkottas in Europe; in the US, John Cage, Patricia Carpenter, Lou Harrison, Earl Kim, Leon Kirchner, Dika Newlin, and Oscar Levant.) and they began writing atonal, expressionist music. He visited extremes of emotion in his String Quartet No. 2 (1907–1908) and Erwartung (1909), and used word painting structurally in Herzgewächse (1911, published with his other works in Der Blaue Reiter Almanach in 1912) and Pierrot lunaire (1912). As opposition and antisemitism gradually deepened his sense of outsider, Jewish identity, he underwent a spiritual turn inspired partly by Gustav Mahler, began Die Jakobsleiter (planned from 1912), and sought a large-scale governing principle like tonality.

He arrived at twelve-tone technique by 1923 and structured works like Moses und Aron (planned from 1923) and the Variations for Orchestra (1926–1928) by extending the logic of developing variation to row-derived intervallic motives (or cells), sometimes in tonally suggestive ways and often organized through combinatorial hexachords. Begleitungsmusik zu einer Lichtspielscene (1929–1930) showed his interest in film, and the Chamber Symphony No. 2 (1939) his continued interest in tonal composition. With U.S. citizenship (1941) and U.S. entry into World War II, he satirized fascist leaders in his twelve-tone Ode to Napoleon (1942, after Byron), quoting Beethoven's fate motif alongside "La Marseillaise" before concluding with an E-flat-major triad.

Post-war Vienna beckoned with honorary citizenship, but Schoenberg was ill, as depicted in his String Trio (1946). As the world learned of the Holocaust, he memorialized its victims in A Survivor from Warsaw (1947). The Israel Conservatory and Academy of Music elected him honorary president in 1951. His innovative music was influential and widely debated, shaping at least three generations of composers, including Milton Babbitt and Pierre Boulez. His aesthetic and music–historical views influenced musicologists Theodor W. Adorno and Carl Dahlhaus. (Note: His views also influenced pianists Charles Rosen, Artur Schnabel, Rudolf Serkin, Eduard Steuermann, and Glenn Gould.) The Arnold Schönberg Center collects his archival legacy.

== Biography ==
=== 1874–1894: Upbringing ===
Arnold Schönberg was born on 13 September 1874 at Obere Donaustraße 5 in Vienna's Leopoldstadt (historically a Jewish ghetto), into a lower-middle-class Jewish family. His father, Samuel, a shoe shopkeeper from Szécsény, Hungary, had moved to Vienna via Pozsony (Pressburg; now Bratislava). His mother Pauline Nachod was from a Prague family belonging to the Old New Synagogue. (Note: Text: "Die Trauung von »Samuel Schönberg aus Pressburg mit der Jgf. Pauline Nachod aus Prag« wurde in der »Wochenschrift für politische, religiöse und Cultur-Interessen« angezeigt. Diese Angaben divergieren vom Aufgebot, das die Kultusgemeinde veröffentlichte: 17. März (1872) 12 ½ Samuel Schönberg Kaufmann aus Szécsény Sohn d. H. Abraham und Fr. Theresia geb Löwy 15. Sept, 1838 II, Taborstr. 4 Pauline Nachod aus Preßburg, Tochter d. H. Josef und d. Fr. Karoline geb. Jontow. 8. März 1843. II Taborstraße 4. Aufgebotsz. u. Deleg. Pressburg 2. März 1872.")

He began violin at eight and soon started teaching himself to write music by arranging and imitating what he played or heard, like military band repertoire, for informal performance. Juvenilia survive from as early as 1882, sometimes only as fragments or parts. They include a birthday march and arrangements of Gustav Pick's Fiakerlied and Vincenzo Bellini's "Ite su colle". He composed violin duets after Ignaz Pleyel and Giovanni Battista Viotti, and advanced to string trios (for two violins and viola) without clear models.

=== 1894–1907: Early life and success ===
Schönberg in Payerbach, 1903

While largely self-taught, Schoenberg began studying counterpoint with Alexander von Zemlinsky around 1894. In 1898, he converted to Lutheran Christianity, in keeping with patterns of Jewish assimilation of the time. This did not displace his Jewish identity, which remained integral to his self-understanding amid rising antisemitism through the 1910s.

In his twenties he supported himself orchestrating operettas while composing his own music, like the string sextet Verklärte Nacht (Transfigured Night, 1899), which he later arranged for string orchestra and remains among his most popular works. It is program music inspired by the narrative of Richard Dehmel's poem by the same name. Schoenberg married Zemlinsky's sister Mathilde in October 1901. They lived in Berlin from 1901 to 1903 and had two children, Gertrud (1902–1947, who in 1921 married Schoenberg's pupil Felix Greissle) and Georg (1906–1974).

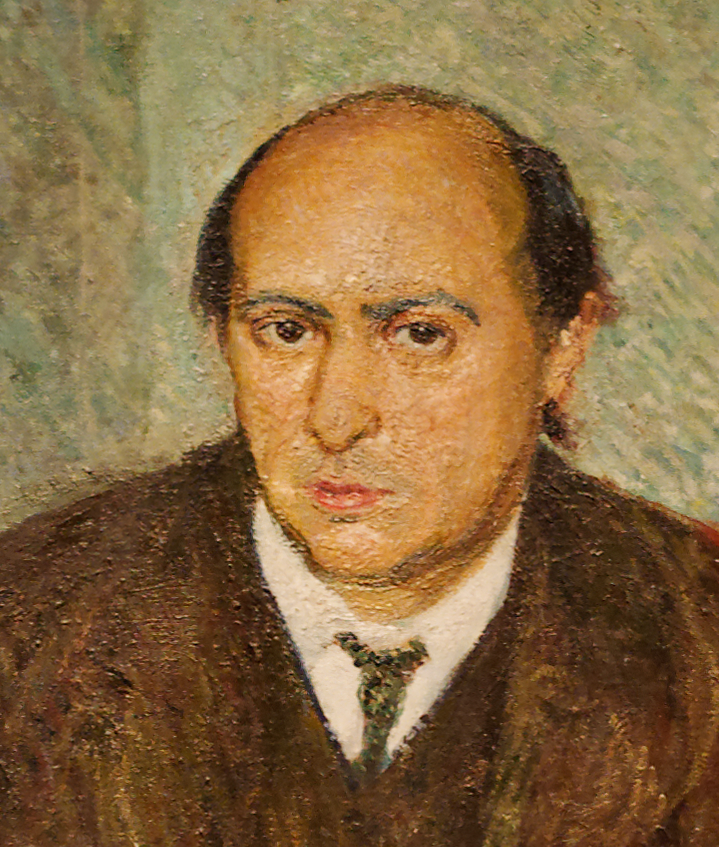
Portrait of Schoenberg by Richard Gerstl, 1905

Early works won Gustav Mahler's favor, and Gurre-Lieder drew Richard Strauss's attention. Schoenberg, initially dismissive of Mahler, was converted by the "thunderbolt" of the Third Symphony, viewing it with devotion as a work of genius. After early setbacks, Schoenberg won some public acceptance in 1907 with the tone poem Pelleas und Melisande in Berlin, though much of his (and his pupils') music met hostility. The Chamber Symphony No. 1 premiered unremarkably in 1907.

=== 1907–1911: Crises and breakthroughs ===
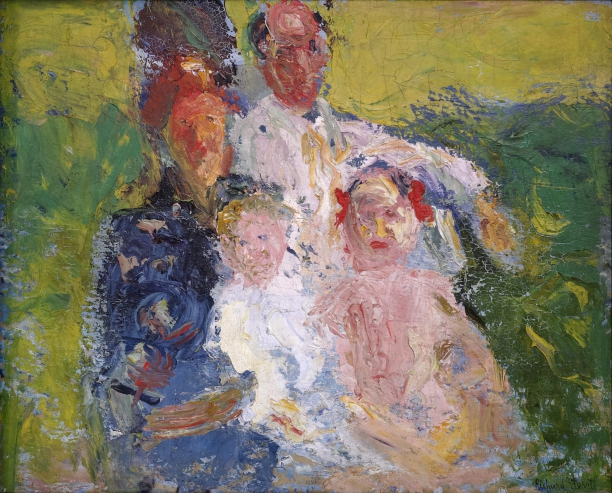
Gerstl's Schönberg Family, 1907

==== Habits fray ====
In 1907–1908, Schoenberg composed his String Quartet No. 2, dedicated to "Meiner Frau" (my wife). In the quartet, Schoenberg quotes the street song "O du lieber Augustin" (Oh, dear Augustin) and traced a Symbolist ascent from ordinary life to an exalted, otherworldly realm. Its final two movements extend chromatic harmony toward atonality, which was emerging amid a wider historical shift. As in a choral symphony, they add soprano and set Stefan George's poems "Litanei" (Litany) and "Entrückung" (Rapture) from Der siebente Ring (The Seventh Ring). Schoenberg likely first encountered George's work in 1904 at the Ansorge-Verein (Ansorge Society), founded to unite poetry and music through recitation and performance, but obtained the poems from his composition pupil Karl Horwitz.

The final poem opens with the speaker's recognition, "I feel the air of other planets". As it unfolds, the "bright beloved shadow [shade]" is "extinguished in a deeper radiance". The speaker is dissolved into the cosmic harmony and sees the "trembling" ground below, "white and soft as whey". The music, inspired by the elusive "tone" Schoenberg described hearing in George's modern, hyperexpressive verse, uses harmonies he later described in Harmonielehre as "schwebende" (fluctuating) and "aufgehoben" (suspended). Mahler was unable to grasp this music and worried about who would carry on his patronage of Schoenberg.

Around the same time (c. 1908–1910), Schoenberg produced roughly two-thirds of his small painting output of about sixty-five oils. His wife left him that summer for painter Richard Gerstl, who died by suicide after her return that November. During his wife's absence, Schoenberg also composed "Du lehnest wider eine Silberweide" (You lean against a silver willow), the thirteenth song in the cycle Das Buch der Hängenden Gärten (The Book of the Hanging Gardens, 1907–1909), based on the collection of the same name by George. This was perhaps his first composition without traditional reference to a key.

==== New ways ====
In 1909, particularly with the third of the Three Piano Pieces and the fifth of the Five Pieces for Orchestra, Schoenberg composed with relative abandon, almost in the manner of stream of consciousness. Meanwhile, Strauss distanced himself, turning to a more conservative idiom after Elektra premiered in 1909.

==== Reflection ====
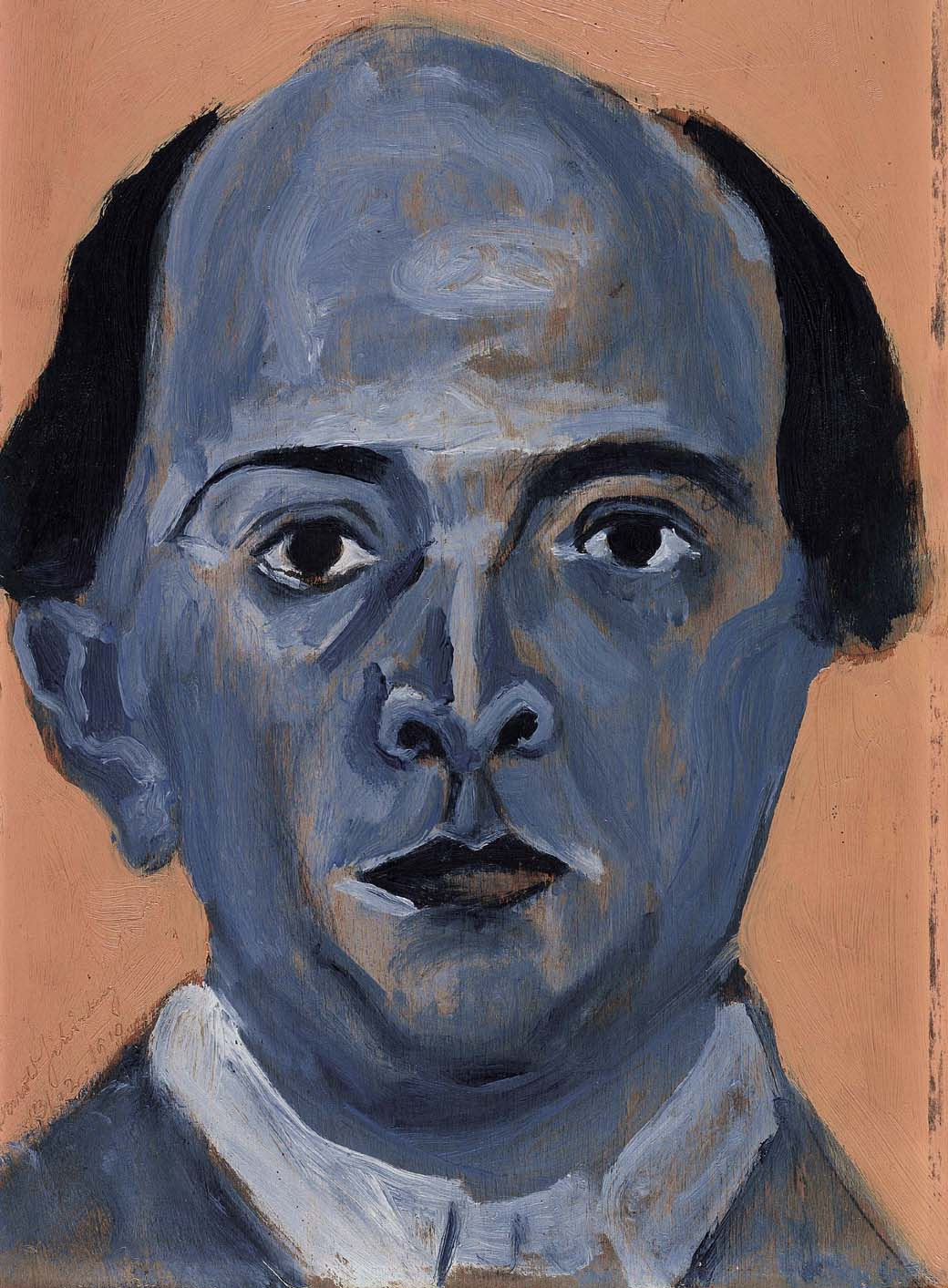
A Schoenberg self-portrait, 1910

During the summer of 1910, Schoenberg wrote his Harmonielehre (Harmony study). That year, he met Edward Clark, an English music journalist working in Germany, who became his only English student. Clark later, as a BBC producer, helped introduce the music of Schoenberg and his pupils, and Schoenberg himself, to Britain.

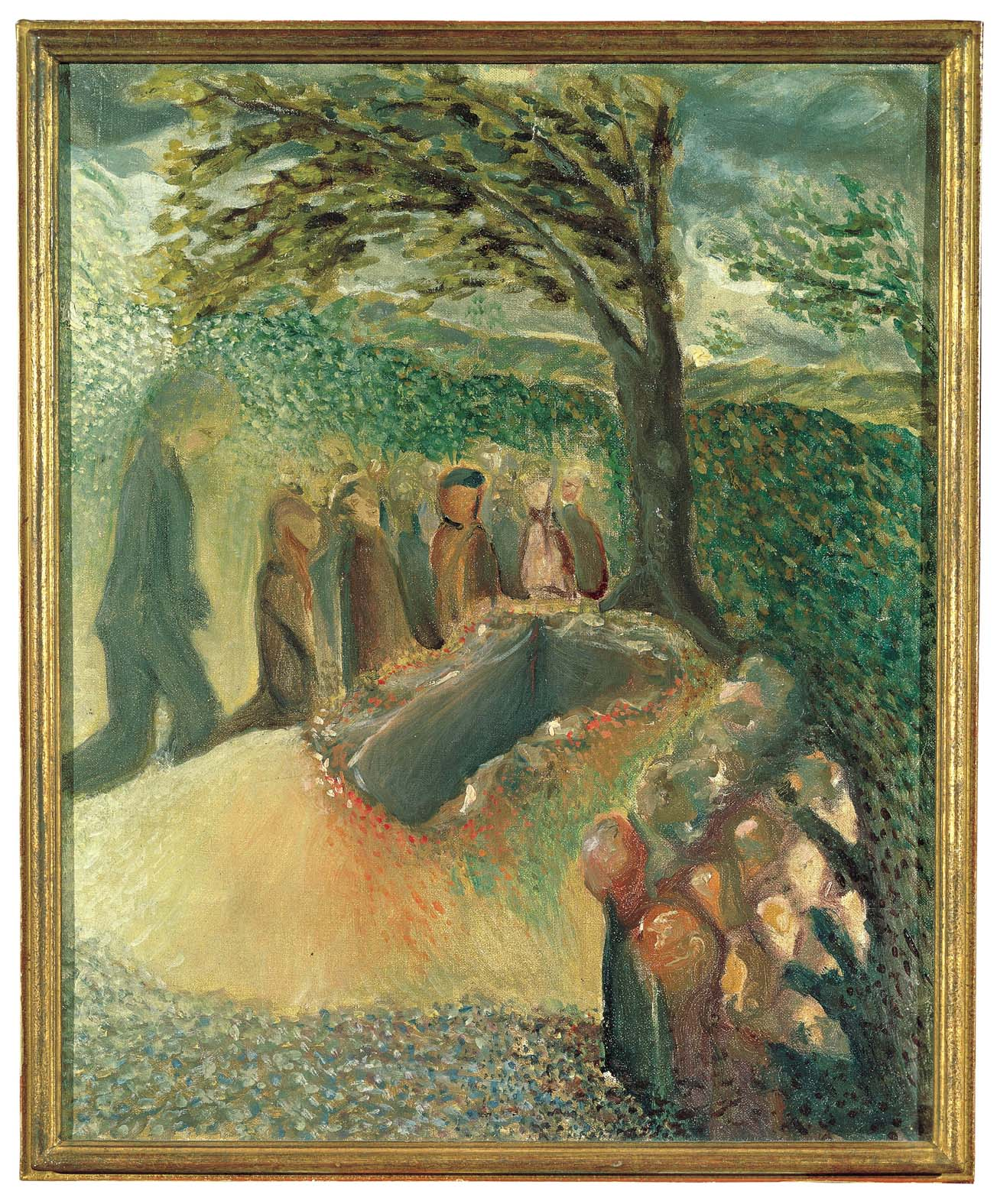
Schoenberg's Burial of Gustav Mahler, 1911

In May 1911, Schoenberg and his pupils attended Mahler's funeral in Grinzing. The last of the Six Little Piano Pieces, from June 1911, echoes the death knell in veneration of the dead with bell-like funeral tolling. The harmonies reach toward resolution (as if) in E major, a key long associated with spirituality, but the melody only briefly touches this (key)note.

==== Bavaria ====
In July, a neighbor's antisemitic abuse and aggression caused Schoenberg to quit work and take his family to stay with Zemlinsky on Lake Starnberg. (Vienna was the "City of Songs by Murdered Artists", Schoenberg wrote Guido Adler.) Mathilde's brother was conducting operettas in nearby Munich. Schoenberg exchanged letters with Wassily Kandinsky before visiting him and other painters Gabriele Münter and Franz Marc in Murnau am Staffelsee.

=== 1911–1915: Wilhelmine Berlin ===
==== Expressionist circles ====
Clark helped Schoenberg, convinced of Vienna's fundamental hostility, move to Berlin in late September 1911. Schoenberg settled at the Villa Lepke in Berlin–Zehlendorf in October. At the time, he belonged to a circle of artists and intellectuals including Herwarth Walden, founder of Der Sturm (The Storm), as well as poet and critic Else Lasker-Schüler, painter Lene Schneider-Kainer, and writer Franz Werfel. From December, his paintings also featured alongside those of Kandinsky and Marc in exhibitions of Der Blaue Reiter, which toured Germany. In addition, he quickly wrote Herzgewächse for inclusion in their almanac.

==== Pierrot as self ====
In 1912, Emil Gutmann, actress Albertine Zehme's agent, sought a suitably outré composer and chose Schoenberg. Since 1910, she had toured Germany performing selections from Albert Giraud's Pierrot lunaire: rondels bergamasques in Otto Erich Hartleben's expressionist translation as recitation songs. The music she commissioned, mainstream Romantic Lieder by Heinrich Schenker pupil Otto Vrieslander, proved "obviously not strong enough", pianist Eduard Steuermann recalled.

Girard's cycle is an allegory of his return to Parnassianism after the Decadent and Symbolist movements (or, perhaps, his attempt to infuse Parnassianism with elements of Symbolism). Schoenberg identified with Pierrot: "We are all [such] moonstruck [Wursteln]", he reflected in 1916, invoking Hanswurst, a Viennese analogue. He likely saw Girard's narrative as a cautionary tale against modernist excess or decadence: (Note: For Josef Rudin, Schoenberg's turns, from tonality to atonality and twelve-tone technique, exemplified enantiodromia.)

What the poet means is that we are trying our best to wipe oﬀ the imaginary moon spots from our clothing at the same time that we worship our crosses. From the scorn for our wounds comes our scorn for our enemies and our power to sacrifice our lives to a moonbeam. One could easily get emotional [...]. But for the cuckoo is anything more important than the price of grain?

He chose and reordered twenty-one poems equally into three sections, tracing Pierrot's inspiration and intoxication, descent into darkness, and journey home. For the music, he devised the now standard five-player Pierrot ensemble (flute/piccolo, clarinet/bass clarinet, violin/viola, cello, and piano). In the preface, he asked the reciter, in Sprechstimme (speaking voice), to realize pitch only fleetingly.

In an apparent epilogue suggesting that his experiences or the passage of time have made home irretrievable, Pierrot reminiscences on an "ancient scent from fairy-tale times". For this wistful ending, Schoenberg evokes closure in E major, as before in venerating Mahler, while melodically outlining a Viennese trichord. That year, he wrote an essay remembering Mahler, whom he called a saint, and began receiving a stipend from the Mahler Foundation.

Also in 1912, Vienna Conservatory director Wilhelm Bopp offered posts to Schoenberg and Franz Schreker to renew what he saw as Robert Fuchs's and Hermann Graedener's stale milieu. Schoenberg declined that June, though he maintained local ties (and had taught a private theory course there the year before), citing his "aversion to Vienna" in a letter to Berg. He felt content despite some economic anxiety. It could have been bad for them both, he wrote Schreker two months later.

==== Recalibration ====
Schoenberg's output slowed after Pierrot as he explored new methods. He planned his oratorio Die Jakobsleiter from as early as 1912 as the finale of an unrealized Mahlerian choral symphony. Its self-written libretto bridges Christian and Judaic sources, and its hexachord ostinato represented emerging structural thinking (perhaps prefiguring his later style) as he sought a unifying principle, leaving many works sketched or unfinished. He later saw the work as a key step on his path toward twelve-tone technique.

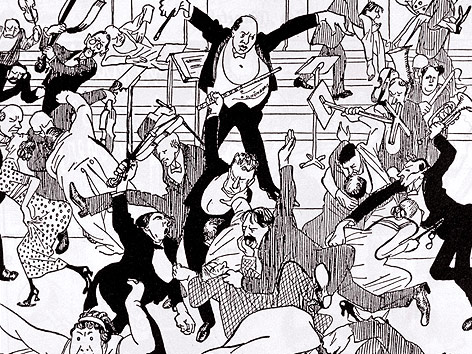
Watschenkonzert, caricature in Die Zeit from 6 April 1913

Gurre-Lieder's belated February 1913 Vienna premiere drew a fifteen-minute standing ovation plus a laurel crown. But when the Chamber Symphony No. 1 was performed alongside Berg's, Webern's, and Zemlinsky's music at the Skandalkonzert (31 March 1913), people left amid applause, and police intervention during audience brawls forced Schoenberg to quit conducting Berg's Altenberg Lieder.

He also began work on Four Orchestral Songs (1913–1916). The first sets George's translation of Ernest Dowson's Symbolist sonnet "Seraphita" to music and features post-Mahlerian orchestration, including a line for six clarinets recalling Brahms, Wagner, and Mozart in its lyricism. Its subject was from Honoré de Balzac's 1834 eponymous novel Séraphîta, (Note: Schoenberg hoped for a dramatization of Balzac's Séraphîta as UFA GmbH tried sound film around 1928 or 1929, he recalled in 1940.) which had also inspired Die Jakobsleiter. The third song sets Rainer Maria Rilke.

==== World War I ====
Amid the August experience of 1914, as World War I began with the Battle of the Frontiers, Schoenberg fell into what he later called "war psychosis", writing Alma Mahler of an imminent "reckoning" that would subjugate French "kitschmongers" Maurice Ravel and Igor Stravinsky. He kept a weather diary, believing that cloud forms could predict the outcome. Thomas Mann touted the exhilarated public mood that November in his essay "Gedanken im Kriege" (Thoughts in Wartime).

On Berlin's home front, Schoenberg enjoyed a respite from music critics, he wrote Zemlinsky in October 1915, but was discouraged. Financial strain deepened as pupils vanished, prompting a return to Vienna in that month.

=== 1915–1918: Habsburg home front and World War I service ===
On Austria-Hungary's home front, Schoenberg soon came to see the war's horror, partly by reading Karl Kraus. By late 1915 he was conscripted (asthma no longer exempted him), and he selected the 4th Infantry Regiment "Hoch- und Deutschmeister", entering service on 15 December. In early 1916, he trained as an officer in Bruck an der Leitha. Organizations and musicians, including Berg, Webern, and possibly Béla Bartók, sought his military discharge. For a soldiers' party, he composed Die eiserne Brigade (The Iron Brigrade, 1916), a tonal spoof march for piano quintet. In August, Berg wrote to his wife Helene that Schoenberg saw "only one solution" to the war: "the Republic of Europe, just like the United States of America."

Schoenberg never saw combat, though rumors suggested that might change. He carried out his duties with loyalty to the Habsburg monarchy until supporters quietly secured his discharge in October 1916. He later joked that these were his happiest years, since he need not be the "notorious Schoenberg". In one of his 1930s notebooks, he recalled being asked if he was and answering, "Nobody wanted to be, someone had to be, so I let it be me." He asserted emancipated dissonance's historical and expressive necessity, and this anecdote may show his own sense of historical necessity.

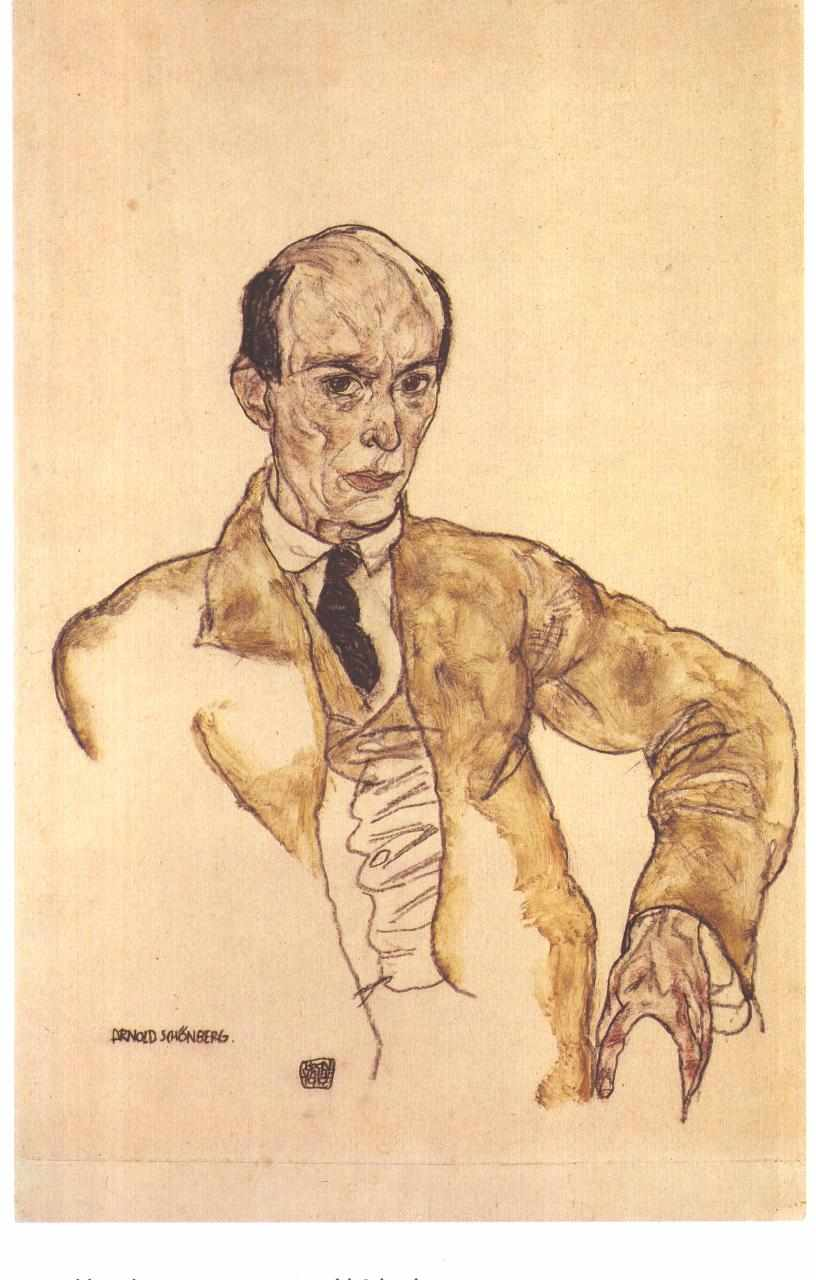
Arnold Schoenberg by Egon Schiele, 1917

=== 1918–1925: Interwar Vienna ===
==== Society for Private Musical Performances ====
In March 1918, he moved to Mödling, near the Vienna Woods. That year, he founded the Society for Private Musical Performances in Red Vienna to present early 20th-century classical music unencumbered by limited rehearsals, unsympathetic conductors, unreceptive audiences, and hostile critics. The Society gave 353 performances, sometimes weekly, to paying members. Schoenberg barred his own works for the first year and a half. Concert programs featured works by Alexander Scriabin, Mahler, Max Reger, Berg, Claude Debussy, and Webern. The Society went defunct amid the Austrian hyperinflation.

==== Mattsee ====
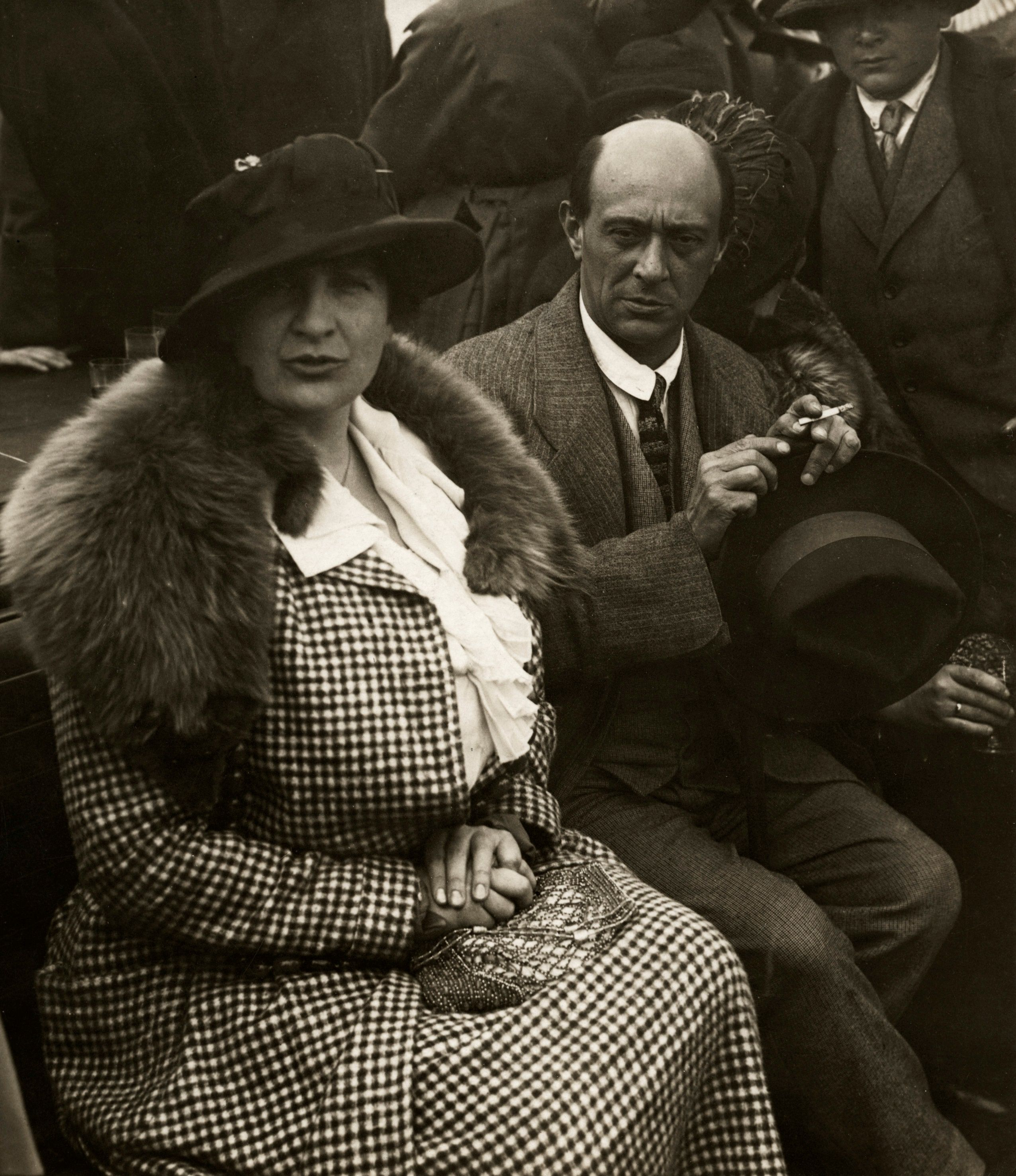
Schoenberg and Alma Mahler, 1920

In summer 1920, after the Society's third season, Schoenberg took his family to Mattsee, near Salzburg, where his brother was the mayor's son-in-law, to work on Die Jakobsleiter. Resorts mostly welcomed paying guests despite rural antisemitism, but Mattsee posted a public notice demanding Jews leave immediately, an ominous precedent years before Hitler's rise and Austria's Nazification. Schoenberg, a Protestant convert proud of his Jewish heritage, was enraged. On June 30, the Neue Wiener Presse reported in "The Baptismal Certificate of the Composer":

Schoenberg ... was requested by ... officials there to furnish ... proof ... he was not a Jew. If he were, he would have to leave [...]. Although Schoenberg could prove that he was a Protestant, he has decided to leave [...]. [He] preferred to avoid ... discussions with the community council; but the question remains ... whether the federal laws may be ignored in ... a place like Mattsee.

==== Twelve-tone principle ====
He wrote Alma Mahler in July 1921 that he had been working on "[s]omething completely new!". He added with irony, "the German Aryans who persecuted me in Mattsee will have this new thing (especially this one) to thank for the fact that even they will still be respected abroad for 100 years", as "they belong to the very state that has just secured ... hegemony in the field of music." (In 1959, pupil Josef Rufer recalled him saying, "I have made a discovery which will ensure the supremacy of German music for the next hundred years", but the precision of this quote has been disputed.)

In 1923, Schoenberg announced the twelve-tone technique as a governing principle he was developing into his own compositional method. Berg, Webern, and pupil Hanns Eisler adopted it, and Roberto Gerhard began studying with him around this time. His earlier works still had to be assimilated before his new ones could be, as their "natural forerunners", he wrote that year to arts patron Werner Reinhart, adding that he aimed more at continuing "properly-understood" tradition than at being a "bogey-man".

After Mathilde died in October 1923, he married Gertrud Kolisch (1898–1967, sister of his pupil, the violinist Rudolf Kolisch) in August 1924. They had three children: Nuria Dorothea (born 1932), Ronald Rudolf (born 1937), and Lawrence Adam (born 1941). Schoenberg used pitches G and E♭ (German: Es, i.e., "S") as a musical cryptogram (G[ertrud] S[choenberg]) in the Suite for septet, Op. 29 (1925).

=== 1925–1933: Weimar-era Berlin ===
In 1925, during the Weimar Republic, Schoenberg was appointed to lead the composition master class at Berlin's Prussian Academy of Arts when Ferruccio Busoni died in 1924. Due to health issues, Schoenberg couldn't leave Vienna and start teaching there until 1926. His pupils then included Nikos Skalkottas (1927–1931) and Natalia Pravosudovich (from 1929; she wrote a memoir about her studies with him).

Schoenberg later recalled that from 1922 to 1930, he felt a loss of influence over younger composers, who explored rapidly changing trends of the Golden Twenties: jazz-influenced styles, machine music, New Objectivity and Gebrauchsmusik (utility music), Spielmusik, and neoclassicism. Widespread opposition was unsettling, even if he saw his critics' arguments as unconvincing. It left him feeling somewhat isolated and caused him to reflect on his artistic aims.

He criticized Weimar-era culture for what he saw as sales-oriented, superficial popular culture, while nonetheless assimilating it. In Three Satires (1925–1926), he mocked the neoclassical style of Stravinsky ("Modernsky") as pastiche ("Just like Papa Bach!"). In related essays, he criticized folklorist composers (likely Bartók) for applying complex methods to "naturally primitive music", and "middle-road" composers (Ernst Krenek and maybe Berg) for writing triads in post-tonal music, framing these tendencies as a doctrinal betrayal.

Krenek, a student of Schreker and Paul Bekker who had written atonal music and wanted to study with Schoenberg, began to stress music's social potential. In 1927, he finished Jonny spielt auf (Jonny strikes up [a tune]). An autobiographical Künstleroper (artist-opera), it became Weimar culture's propotypical Zeitoper (opera of the time). It centers on Jonny, an African American jazz musician (originally portrayed in blackface) who triumphs over European traditions epitomized by the intellectual composer Max. In awe of the sublime, Max sings the opening line, "Du schöner Berg!" (You beautiful mountain). Krenek was likely satirizing Schoenberg.

Schoenberg wrote but did not execute a reply to Krenek's separate barbs about "an individual who ... invents rules". Instead, he and his second wife likely answered Krenek in their one-act comic twelve-tone Zeitoper, Von heute auf morgen (From Today to Tomorrow, 1928–1929), about what it means to be modern. She wrote the libretto under the pseudonym Max Blonda, perhaps after the role of Max in Krenek's opera. The opening line, "Schön, war es dort!" (It was lovely there), may refer to the beautiful, even sacred mountains. (In the 1930s, Krenek returned to the fold, completing the first full-length twelve-tone opera, Karl V.)

=== 1933–1934: Migration ===
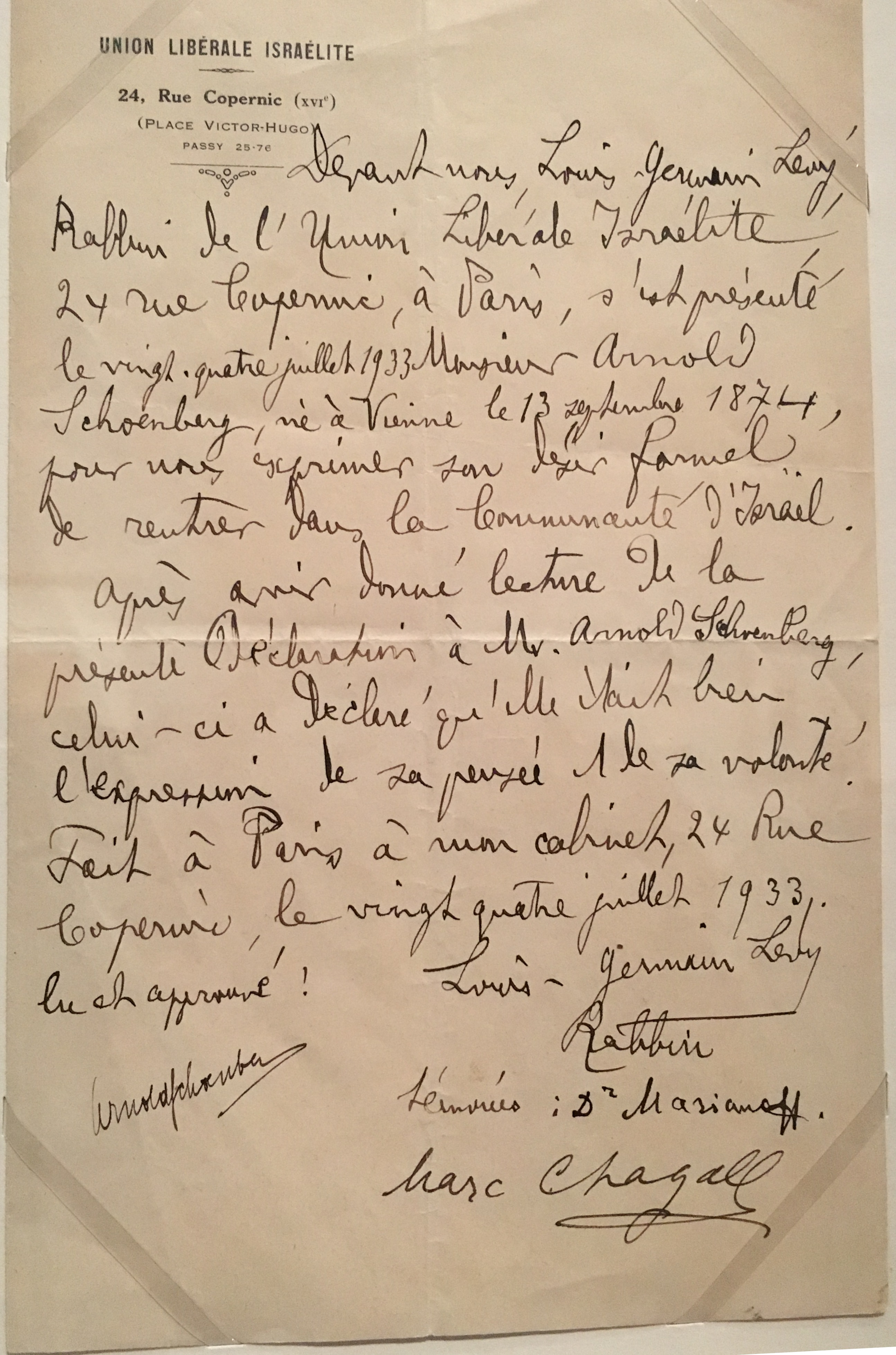
Schoenberg marked his return to Judaism with Rabbi Louis Germain Lévy, witnessed by Marc Chagall and Albert Einstein's son-in-law David Marianoff

Schoenberg continued as professor until the Nazis seized power in 1933. While visiting France, he was warned that returning to Germany would be dangerous. He formally returned to Judaism at a Paris synagogue, viewing his heritage as ineluctable in his opposition to Nazism. Though this return might seem sudden, he wrote Berg in October 1933, it was the result of an exceedingly long process.

He and his family then migrated to the United States, though he considered England and the Soviet Union. His first teaching post was at the Malkin Conservatory (Boston University). After arriving on 31 October 1933, he adopted the spelling "Schoenberg" instead of "Schönberg", calling it "deference to American practice".

In 1934, he applied for a harmony and theory position at the New South Wales State Conservatorium in Sydney. Vincent Plush found the application in the 1970s. It bore two notes with different handwriting: "Jewish" and "Modernist ideas and dangerous tendencies", the latter marked E.B. (Edgar Bainton).

Schoenberg also explored the idea of emigrating to New Zealand. His secretary and pupil Richard Hoffmann, nephew of his mother-in-law, Henriette Kolisch, lived there from 1935 to 1947. Since childhood, Schoenberg had been fascinated with islands, especially New Zealand, possibly due to its scenic postage stamps. He abandoned the idea as his health declined in 1944.

=== 1934–1951: Los Angeles ===
He moved to Los Angeles, where he taught at the University of Southern California and the University of California, Los Angeles, each of which later named facilities in his honor, including UCLA's Schoenberg Music Building and USC's Schoenberg Hall. He was appointed visiting professor at UCLA in 1935 on the recommendation of Otto Klemperer, music director and conductor of the Los Angeles Philharmonic Orchestra.

In 1936, he was promoted to professor, with a $5,100 annual salary. In 1937, he paid $18,000 for a Spanish Colonial home at 116 North Rockingham in Brentwood Park, near the UCLA campus. It was an idyllic, low-density suburb with a nearby park and neighboring horses, and he often enjoyed walks with his family, as he recalled taking in the Vienna Woods. Directly across was Shirley Temple's house, where he befriended fellow composer (and tennis partner) George Gershwin.

The Schoenbergs were able to employ domestic help and began holding Sunday afternoon gatherings that were known for excellent coffee and Viennese pastries. Frequent guests included Otto Klemperer (who studied composition privately with Schoenberg beginning in April 1936), Edgard Varèse, Joseph Achron, Louis Gruenberg, Ernst Toch, and, on occasion, well-known actors such as Harpo Marx and Peter Lorre. Composers Leonard Rosenman and George Tremblay and the Hollywood orchestrator Edward B. Powell studied with Schoenberg at this time.

During this late period, he composed several notable works, including the Violin Concerto, Op. 36 (1934/36), Ode to Napoleon Buonaparte, Op. 41 (1942), and Piano Concerto, Op. 42 (1942). Alongside this twelve-tone music, Schoenberg also revisited tonality in the Suite for Strings in G major (1935), the Kol Nidre, Op. 39, for chorus and orchestra (1938), the Chamber Symphony No. 2 in E♭ minor, Op. 38 (begun in 1906, completed in 1939), and the Variations on a Recitative in D minor, Op. 40 (1941). At the time, his notable students included John Cage and Lou Harrison.

In 1941, he became a U.S. citizen. He was the first composer in residence at the Music Academy of the West summer conservatory in Montecito, California. He was interested in Hopalong Cassidy films, which Paul Buhle and David Wagner (2002, v–vii) attribute to the films' left-wing screenwriters, though Schoenberg had previously called himself a bourgeois turned monarchist.

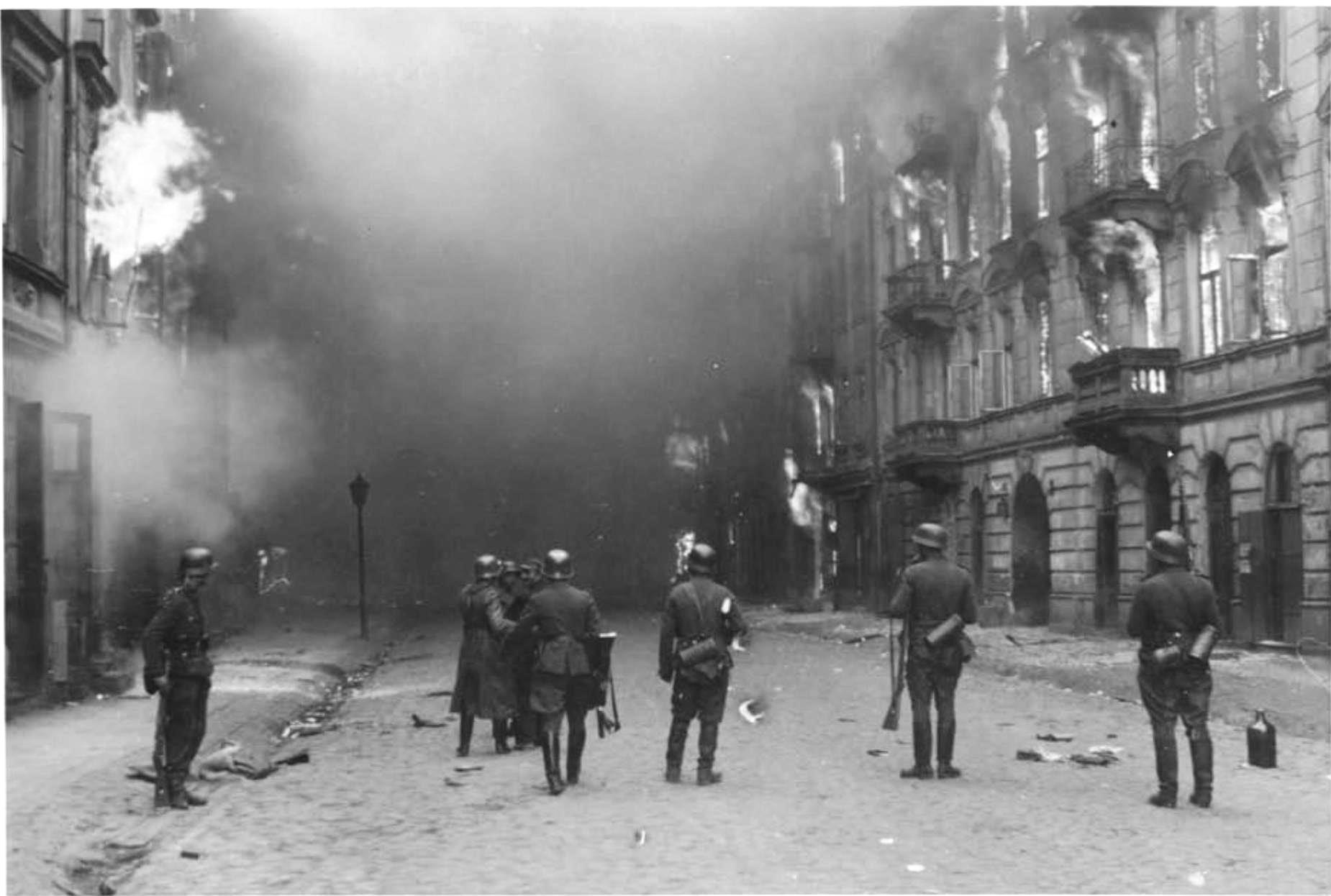
Warsaw Ghetto Uprising. In 1947 Schoenberg wrote A Survivor from Warsaw in commemoration of this event.

As the world learned of the Holocaust, he memorialized its victims in A Survivor from Warsaw, Op. 46 (1947).

==== Doktor Faustus dispute ====
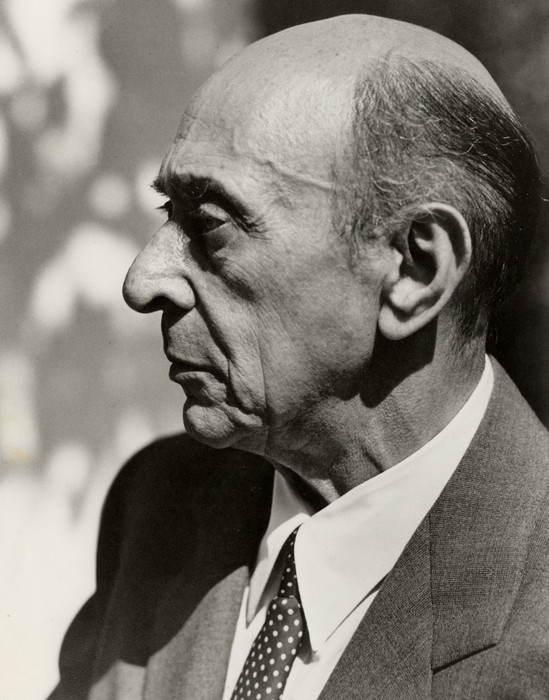
Schoenberg in Los Angeles, 1947

Adrian Leverkühn, the protagonist of Mann's novel Doktor Faustus (1947), is a composer whose use of twelve-tone technique parallels the innovations of Arnold Schoenberg. Leverkühn, who may be based on Nietzsche, sells his soul to the Devil and is rewarded with superhuman talent. Schoenberg was unhappy about this and initiated an exchange of letters with Mann following the novel's publication. Writer Sean O'Brien comments that "written in the shadow of Hitler, Doktor Faustus observes the rise of Nazism, but its relationship to political history is oblique". Thomas Mann was always primarily interested in classical music, which also plays a role in many of his works. He sought and received advice from Adorno on the technical compositional details of Schoenberg's new music, and revised the chapters accordingly.

==== Death ====
Schoenberg's superstitious nature may have contributed to his death. The composer had triskaidekaphobia, and according to friend Katia Mann, he feared he would die during a year that was a multiple of 13. This possibly began in 1908 with the composition of the thirteenth song of the song cycle Das Buch der Hängenden Gärten Op. 15. He dreaded his sixty-fifth birthday in 1939 so much that a friend asked the composer and astrologer Dane Rudhyar to prepare Schoenberg's horoscope. Rudhyar did this and told Schoenberg that the year was dangerous, but not fatal.

But in 1950, on his 76th birthday, an astrologer wrote Schoenberg a note warning him that the year was a critical one: 7 + 6 = 13. This stunned and depressed the composer, for up to that point he had only been wary of multiples of 13 and never considered adding the digits of his age. He died on Friday, 13 July 1951, shortly before midnight. Schoenberg had stayed in bed all day, sick, anxious, and depressed. His wife Gertrud reported in a telegram to her sister-in-law Ottilie the next day that Arnold died at 11:45 pm, 15 minutes before midnight. In a letter to Ottilie dated 4 August 1951, Gertrud explained, "About a quarter to twelve I looked at the clock and said to myself: another quarter of an hour and then the worst is over. Then the doctor called me. Arnold's throat rattled twice, his heart gave a powerful beat and that was the end".

==== Burial and estate ====
After her husband's death in 1951, his wife Gertrud founded Belmont Music Publishers, devoted to the publication of his works. Winfried Zillig prepared the unfinished Die Jakobsleiter for performance at her request. Schoenberg had also been unable to complete his opera Moses und Aron (1932/33), which was one of the first works of its genre written completely using dodecaphonic composition.

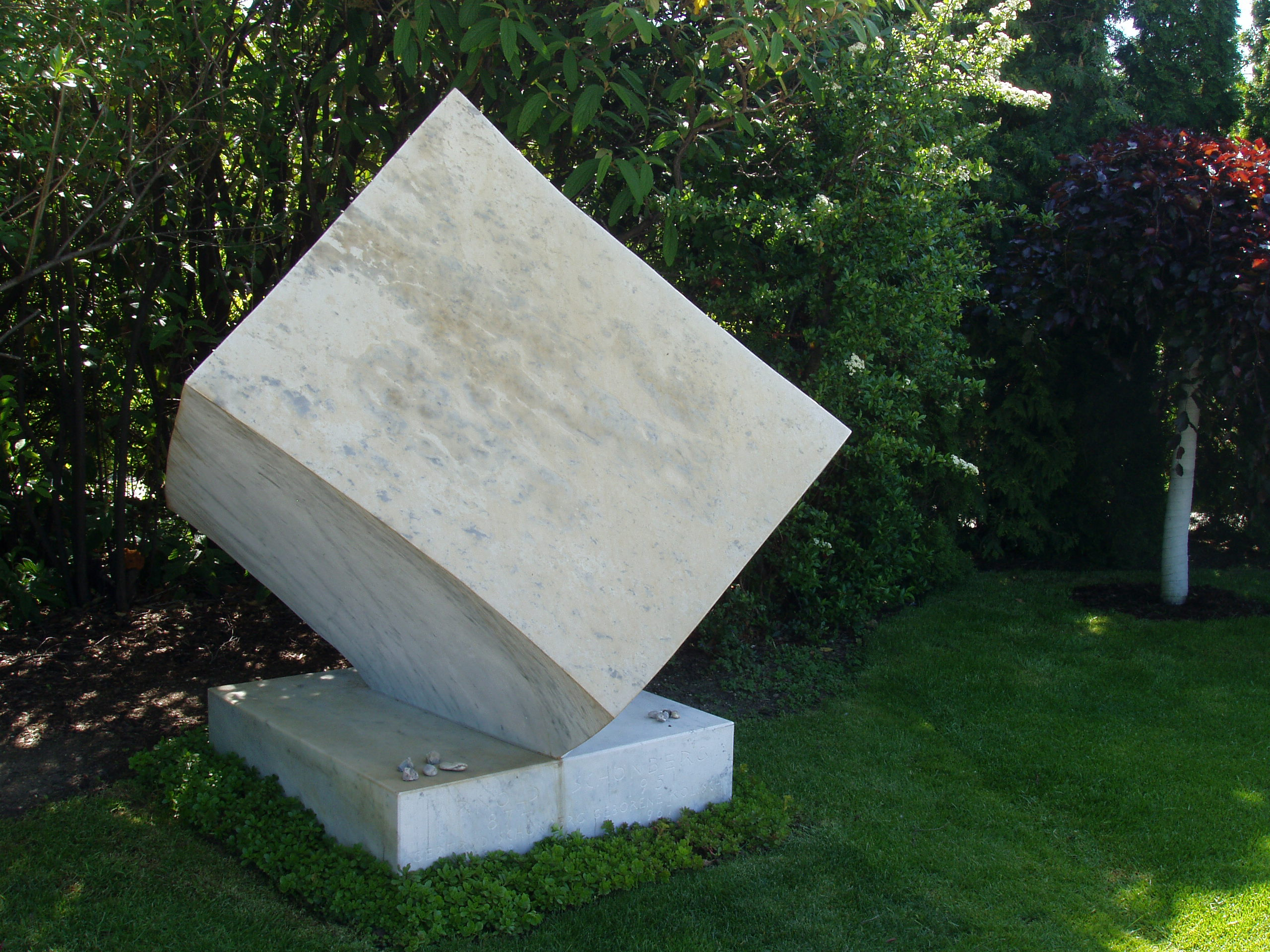
Schoenberg's grave at the Vienna Central Cemetery

Schoenberg's ashes were later interred at the Vienna Central Cemetery on 6 June 1974.

== Music ==
Schoenberg's significant compositions in the repertory of modern art music span over a period of more than 50 years. Traditionally they are divided into three periods, though this division is arguably arbitrary as the music in each of these periods are stylistically varied. The idea that his twelve-tone period "represents a stylistically unified body of works is simply not supported by the musical evidence", and important musical characteristics—especially those related to motivic development—transcend these boundaries completely.

The first of these periods, 1894–1907, is identified in the legacy of the high-Romantic composers of the late nineteenth century, as well as with expressionist movements in poetry and art. The second, 1908–1922, is typified by the experimentation with extended tonality, and the eventual abandonment of key centers, a move often described (though not by Schoenberg) as "free atonality". The third, from 1923 onward, begins with Schoenberg's compositional use of twelve-tone technique.

Schoenberg's pupils, including Berg, Eisler, and Webern, followed Schoenberg through these periods with considerable experimentation and variety of approach.

=== Until 1908: Late Romanticism ===
Schoenberg's compositional style in his first major period was highly romantic, but took conventions of the period in unique directions. Beginning with songs and string quartets written around the turn of the century, Schoenberg's procedures exhibited characteristics of both Brahms and Wagner. For most contemporary listeners, Brahms and Wagner considered polar opposites, representing mutually exclusive directions in the legacy of German music. This compositional style positioned him uniquely among his peers. Schoenberg's Six Songs, Op. 3 (1899–1903), for example, exhibit a conservative clarity of tonal organization typical of Brahms and Mahler, reflecting an interest in balanced phrases and an undisturbed hierarchy of key relationships. However, the songs also explore unusually bold incidental chromaticism and seem to aspire to a Wagnerian "representational" approach to motivic identity.

Schoenberg's combination of Brahmsian and Wagnerian approaches reached an apex in his Verklärte Nacht, Op. 4 (1899), a work for string sextet that develops several distinctive "leitmotif"-like themes, each one eclipsing and subordinating the last. The only motivic elements that persist throughout the work are those that are perpetually dissolved, varied, and re-combined, in a technique, identified primarily in Brahms's music, that Schoenberg called "developing variation". Schoenberg's procedures in the work are organized in two ways simultaneously; at once suggesting a Wagnerian narrative of motivic ideas, as well as a Brahmsian approach to motivic development and tonal cohesion.

Citing comments on Schoenberg's String Quartet No. 1, Op. 7 (1904–1905) by Berg and Webern, music theorist Joseph N. Straus emphasized the importance of "motivic coherence" in the three's œuvres more generally. (Note: Straus argued that "preoccupation with motivic coherence characterizes a whole range of early twentieth-century [classical] music", ascribing it to "much of the work" of Béla Bartók and Igor Stravinsky. He noted his argument's reliance on pitch-class set theory while admitting the theory's inadequacy to analysts' aspiration to a "true unified-field theory of post-tonal music" à la Schenkerian analysis.) Berg asserted, "[e]very smallest turn of phrase, even accompanimental figuration is significant", parenthetically praising Schoenberg's "excess unheard-of since Bach". Webern marveled at how "Schoenberg creates an accompaniment figure from a motivic particle", proclaiming "everything is thematic! There is ... not a single note ... that does not have a thematic basis."

=== 1908–1923: Atonality ===
Second String Quartet, fourth movement
Played by the Carmel Quartet with soprano Rona Israel-Kolatt, in 2007

Schoenberg's use of musical constructions lacking in tonal centers or traditional dissonance-consonance relationships can be traced as far back as his Chamber Symphony No. 1, Op. 9 (1906). This work is frequently noted for its tonal development of whole-tone and quartal harmony, and its initiation of dynamic and unusual ensemble relationships, involving dramatic interruption and unpredictable instrumental allegiances. Many of these features would typify the timbre-oriented chamber-music aesthetic of the coming century.

Schoenberg's music from 1908 onward frequently experiments with the absence of traditional keys or tonal centers. His first piece that lacked an explicitly stated key center was the second string quartet, Op. 10, with soprano. The last movement of this piece has no key signature, marking Schoenberg's formal divorce from diatonic harmonies. Other important works of the era include his song cycle Das Buch der Hängenden Gärten, Op. 15 (1908–1909), his Five Orchestral Pieces, Op. 16 (1909), the influential Pierrot lunaire, Op. 21 (1912), as well as his dramatic Erwartung, Op. 17 (1909). Surveying Schoenberg's Opp. 10, 15–16, and 19, Webern argued: "It creates entirely new expressive values; therefore it also needs new means of expression. Content and form cannot be separated."

Analysts (most prominently Allen Forte) so emphasized motivic shapes in the "free atonal" music of Schoenberg, Berg, and Webern that Benjamin Boretz and William Benjamin suggested referring to it as "motivic" music. Schoenberg himself described his use of a motivic unit in his Four Orchestral Songs as "varied and developed in manifold ways". Schoenberg continued that he was "in the preliminary stages of a procedure ... which allows for a motif to be a constant basis". Straus considered that the designation "'motivic' music" might apply "in a modified way" to twelve-tone music more generally.

=== 1923–1951: Twelve-tone composition (and tonal revisiting) ===
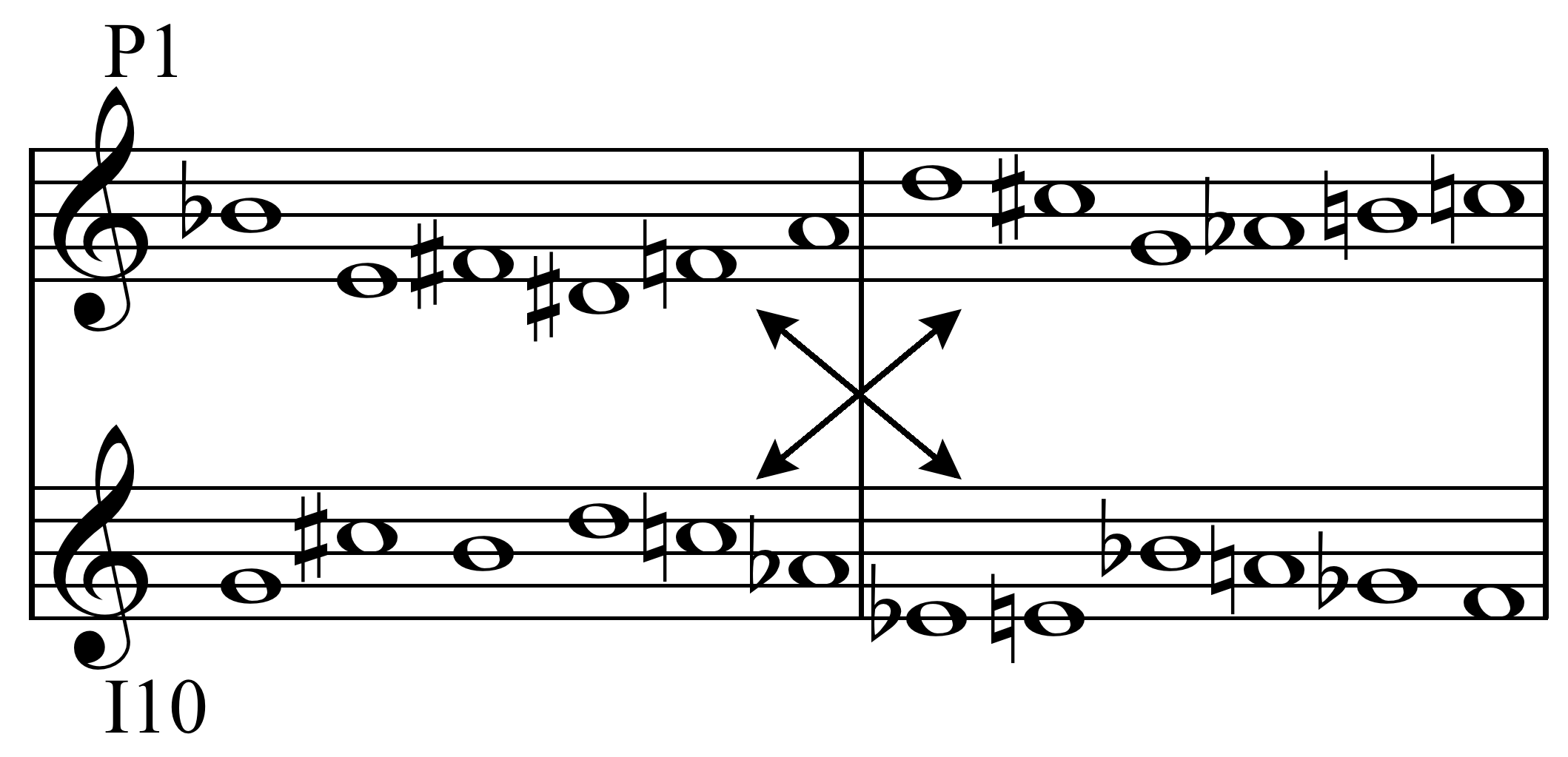
In Schoenberg's Variations for Orchestra, Op. 31, tone row form P1's second half has the same notes, in a different order, as the first half of I10: "Thus it is possible to employ P1 and I10 simultaneously and in parallel motion without causing note doubling".

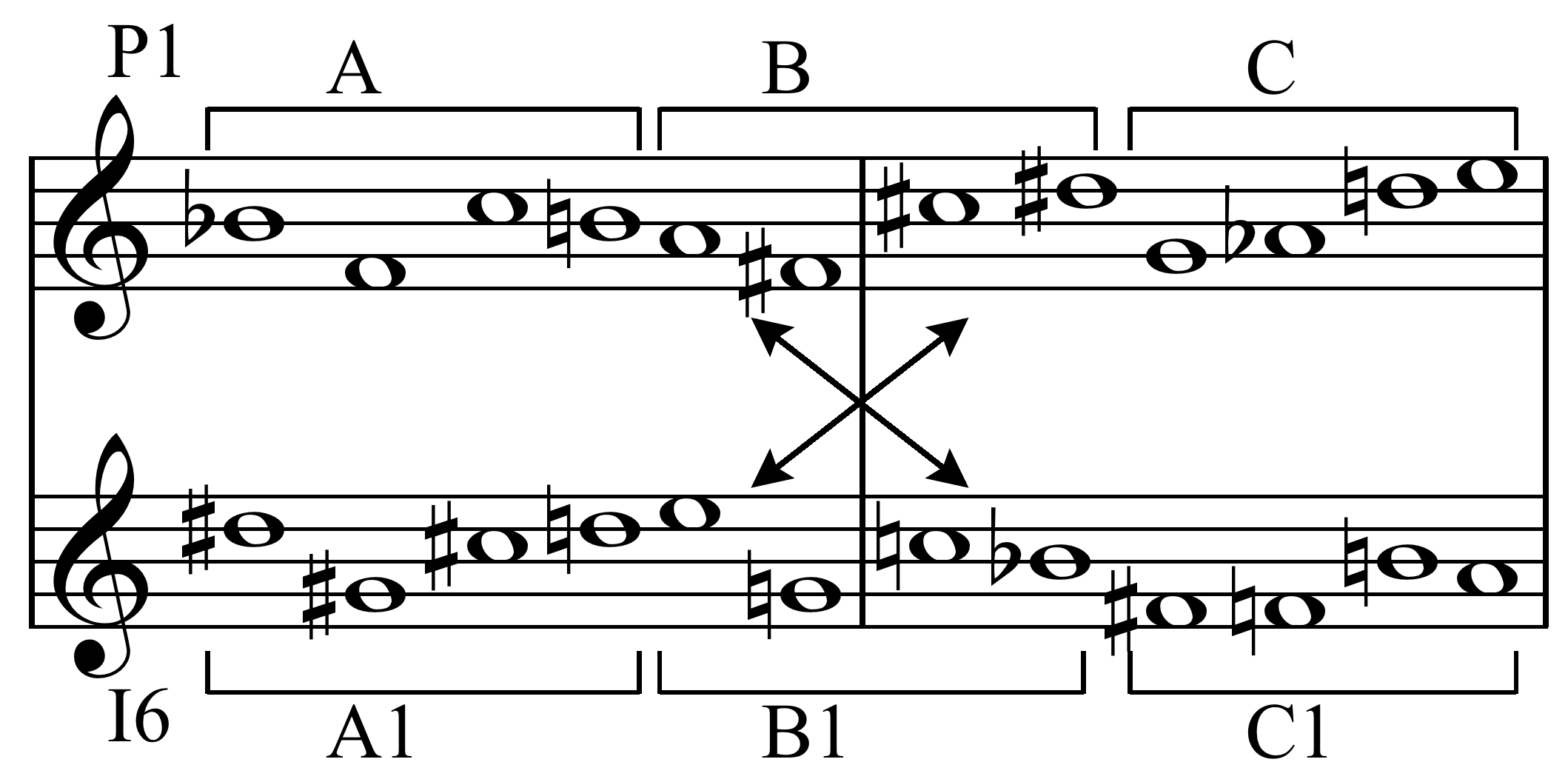
Featuring hexachordal combinatoriality between its primary forms, P1 and I6, Schoenberg's Piano Piece, Op. 33a, tone row contains three perfect fifths, which is the relation between P1 and I6, and a source of contrast between "accumulations of 5ths" and "generally more complex simultaneity". For example, group A consists of B♭-F-C-B♮, while the "more blended" group B consists of A-F♯-C♯-D♯

In the aftermath of World War I, Schoenberg began to use ordered tone rows in his compositions. Schoenberg described this as a "method of composing with twelve tones which are related only with one another". All twelve pitches of the octave (usually unrealized compositionally) are regarded as equal, and no one note or tonality is given the emphasis it occupied in traditional tonal harmony. This manner of composition is most often referred to as twelve-tone technique.

Among Schoenberg's twelve-tone works are the Variations for Orchestra, Op. 31 (1928); Begleitungsmusik zu einer Lichtspielscene, Op. 34 (1930); Piano Pieces, Opp. 33a & b (1931), and the Piano Concerto, Op. 42 (1942). Contrary to its reputation for doctrinaire strictness, Schoenberg's technique varied according to the musical demands of each composition. Thus the musical structure of his unfinished opera Moses und Aron is fundamentally different from that of his Phantasy for Violin and Piano, Op. 47 (1949).

Ten features of Schoenberg's mature twelve-tone practice are generally characteristic, interdependent, and interactive according to Ethan Haimo:

1. Hexachordal inversional combinatoriality
2. Aggregates
3. Linear set presentation
4. Partitioning
5. Isomorphic partitioning
6. Invariants
7. Hexachordal levels
8. Harmony, "consistent with and derived from the properties of the referential set"
9. Metre, established through "pitch-relational characteristics"
10. Multidimensional set presentations

He also revisited tonality, as in the Chamber Symphony No. 2.

== Reception ==
Schoenberg is regarded as a central, influential, and enigmatic figure who reshaped 20th-century classical music, though commentary and controversy has often overshadowed his music.

=== Nazi Germany ===
Schoenberg's Jewish identity made his music an obvious target for the cultural policy of the Nazi Party, under which it was denounced as degenerate art. Music with which he was associated was also criticized by leading Nazi figures. At the Reichstag building in 1935, Nazi theorist Alfred Rosenberg claimed that "the whole atonal movement ... is contradictory to the rhythm of blood and soul of the German nation." Hans Severus Ziegler's 1938 Degenerate Art exhibition included works by Schoenberg's circle to show their alleged "Jewish spirit".

While Schoenberg's music was effectively excluded, defenders of modernist techniques remained in some institutions. Strauss, who privately criticized the Nazis, was appointed as president (1933–1935) of the Reich Chamber of Music. He objected to Ziegler's broad use of the "atonal" label, which risked including works beyond Schoenberg's circle, including his own. Strauss was dismissed when his correspondence with Jewish writer Stefan Zweig came to light. Musicologist Herbert Gerigk, affiliated with Rosenberg's ideology bureau, held that "atonality can produce worthwhile art" provided its creator met political and racial criteria.

Schoenberg's pupils responded in different ways. Some, including Berg and Webern, maintained degrees of political ambiguity to try to continue their lives in music. Composer Paul von Klenau defended twelve-tone technique in terms aligned with the rhetoric of Nazism, presenting it as a form of disciplined, anti-individualist order. He avoided any mention of Schoenberg. Winfried Zillig used the technique in overtly tonal, triadic music.

=== Composers and performers ===
From the 1940s, composers extended Schoenberg's legacy in new directions.

==== United States ====
Schoenberg's music has been performed across the United States' major cities. His advocates included the Franco–American conductor–pianist Jacques-Louis Monod.

Schoenberg's pupils were influential teachers at major universities, including Richard Hoffmann at Oberlin Conservatory of Music; Leonard Stein at University of Southern California, University of California, Los Angeles and California Institute of the Arts; Patricia Carpenter at Columbia University, and Earl Kim and Leon Kirchner at Harvard University.

Musicians associated with Schoenberg had a profound influence on contemporary music performance practice, including Eugene Lehner, Rudolf Kolisch, and Louis Krasner at the New England Conservatory of Music, and Eduard Steuermann and Felix Galimir at the Juilliard School.

Milton Babbitt began studying Schoenberg's music in the 1930s.

==== Post-war Western Europe ====
Hans Keller, René Leibowitz, and Luigi Rognoni spread Schoenberg's musical legacy beyond Germany and Austria. Composers such as Pierre Boulez, Luigi Nono, and Karlheinz Stockhausen extended Schoenberg's legacy in increasingly radical directions.

Schoenberg pupil and assistant Max Deutsch, who later became a professor of music, was also a conductor. He recorded Schoenberg's music with the Orchestre de la Suisse Romande. A late 2013 release included some of Deutsch's talks on this music.

=== Scholars and writers ===
In his Philosophy of New Music, Adorno contrasted Schoenberg and Stravinsky.

Richard Taruskin asserted that Schoenberg committed what he terms a "poietic fallacy", the conviction that what matters most (or all that matters) in a work of art is the making of it, the maker's input, and that the listener's pleasure must not be the composer's primary objective. Taruskin also criticizes the ideas of measuring Schoenberg's value as a composer in terms of his influence on other artists, the overrating of technical innovation, and the restriction of criticism to matters of structure and craft while derogating other approaches as vulgarian.

According to Ethan Haimo, the general understanding of Schoenberg's twelve-tone work has been difficult to achieve because of the "truly revolutionary nature" of his new system, misinformation disseminated by some early writers about the system's "rules" and "exceptions" that bear "little relation to the most significant features of Schoenberg's music", the composer's secretiveness, and the widespread unavailability of his sketches and manuscripts until the late 1970s. During his life, Schoenberg was "subjected to a range of criticism and abuse that is shocking even in hindsight".

In his 1977 biography of the composer, Christopher Small observed "[m]any music lovers, even today, find difficulty with Schoenberg's music". According to Nicholas Cook, writing some twenty years after Small, Schoenberg had thought that this lack of comprehension

was merely a transient, if unavoidable phase: the history of music, they said, showed that audiences always resisted the unfamiliar, but in time they got used to it and learned to appreciate it ... Schoenberg himself looked forward to a time when, as he said, grocers' boys would whistle serial music in their rounds. If Schoenberg really believed what he said (and it is hard to be quite sure about this), then it represents one of the most poignant moments in the history of music. For serialism did not achieve popularity; the process of familiarization for which he and his contemporaries were waiting never occurred.

Ben Earle (2003) found that Schoenberg, while revered by experts and taught to "generations of students" on degree courses, remained unloved by the public. Despite more than forty years of advocacy and the production of "books devoted to the explanation of this difficult repertory to non-specialist audiences", it would seem that in particular, "British attempts to popularize music of this kind ... can now safely be said to have failed".

In his 2018 biography of Schoenberg's near contemporary and similarly pioneering composer, Debussy, Stephen Walsh takes issue with the idea that it is not possible "for a creative artist to be both radical and popular". Walsh concludes, "Schoenberg may be the first 'great' composer in modern history whose music has not entered the repertoire almost a century and a half after his birth".

Harold C. Schonberg writes "Pierrot Lunaire is a magical and evocative score that inhabits a ghostly, miniature, imagery-ridden world full of blood symbolism. Today it is recognized as being as seminal a work as Le Sacre du Printemps, Joyce’s Ulysses and Picasso’s Les Demoiselles d'Avignon."

== Textbooks ==
- 1922. Harmonielehre, third edition. Vienna: Universal Edition. (Originally published 1911).
- 1943. Models for Beginners in Composition, New York: G. Schirmer, Inc.
- 1954. Structural Functions of Harmony. New York: W. W. Norton; London: Williams and Norgate. Revised edition, New York, London: W. W. Norton and Company 1969. ISBN 978-0-393-00478-6
- 1964. Preliminary Exercises in Counterpoint, edited with a foreword by Leonard Stein. New York, St. Martin's Press. Reprinted, Los Angeles: Belmont Music Publishers 2003.
- 1967. Fundamentals of Musical Composition, edited by Gerald Strang, with an introduction by Leonard Stein. New York: St. Martin's Press. Reprinted 1985, London: Faber and Faber. ISBN 978-0-571-09276-5
- 1978. Theory of Harmony, English edition, translated by Roy E. Carter, based on Harmonielehre 1922. Berkeley, Los Angeles: University of California Press. ISBN 978-0-520-03464-8
- 1979. Die Grundlagen der musikalischen Komposition, translated into German by Rudolf Kolisch; edited by Rudolf Stephan. Vienna: Universal Edition (German translation of Fundamentals of Musical Composition).
- 2003. Preliminary Exercises in Counterpoint, Reprinted, Los Angeles: Belmont Music Publishers.
- 2010. Theory of Harmony, 100th Anniversary Edition. Berkeley: California University Press. 2nd edition. ISBN 978-0-52026-608-7
- 2016. Models for Beginners in Composition, Reprinted, London: Oxford University Press. ISBN 978-0-19538-221-1

== Writings ==
- 1947. "The Musician". In The Works of the Mind, edited by Robert B. Heywood, Chicago: University of Chicago Press. OCLC 752682744
- 1950. Style and Idea: Selected Writings of Arnold Schoenberg, edited and translated by Dika Newlin. New York: Philosophical Library.
- 1958. Ausgewählte Briefe, by B. Schott's Söhne, Mainz.
- 1964. Arnold Schoenberg Letters, selected and edited by Erwin Stein, translated from the original German by Eithne Wilkins and Ernst Kaiser. London: Faber and Faber Ltd.
- 1965. Arnold Schoenberg Letters, selected and edited by Erwin Stein, translated from the original German by Eithne Wilkins and Ernst Kaiser. New York: St.Martin's Press.
- 1975. Style and Idea: Selected Writings of Arnold Schoenberg, edited by Leonard Stein, with translations by Leo Black. New York: St. Martins Press; London: Faber & Faber. ISBN 978-0-520-05294-9 Expanded from the 1950 Philosophical Library (New York) publication edited by Dika Newlin (559 pages from 231). The volume carries the note "Several of the essays ... were originally written in German (translated by Dika Newlin)" in both editions.
- 1984. Style and Idea: Selected Writings, translated by Leo Black. Berkeley: California University Press.
- 1984. Arnold Schoenberg Wassily Kandinsky: Letters, Pictures and Documents, edited by Jelena Hahl-Koch, translated by John C. Crawford. London: Faber and Faber. ISBN 0-571-13060-7, ISBN 0-571-13194-8
- 1987. Arnold Schoenberg Letters, selected and edited by Erwin Stein, translated from the original German by Eithne Wilkins and Ernst Kaiser. Berkeley and Los Angeles: University of California Press. ISBN 978-0-520-06009-8
- 2006. The Musical Idea and the Logic, Technique, and Art of Its Presentation, new paperback English edition. Bloomington and London: Indiana University Press. ISBN 978-0-25321-835-3
- 2010. Style and Idea: Selected Writings, 60th anniversary (second) edition, translated by Leonard Stein and Leo Black. Berkeley: California University Press. ISBN 978-0-52026-607-0

== See also ==
- Arnold Schönberg Complete Edition
- Arnold Schönberg Prize
- Fragmentation
- List of Austrians in music
- List of refugees
- Organic unity
