= Pelleas und Melisande (Schoenberg) =

Orchestral work based on the play by Maurice Maeterlinck

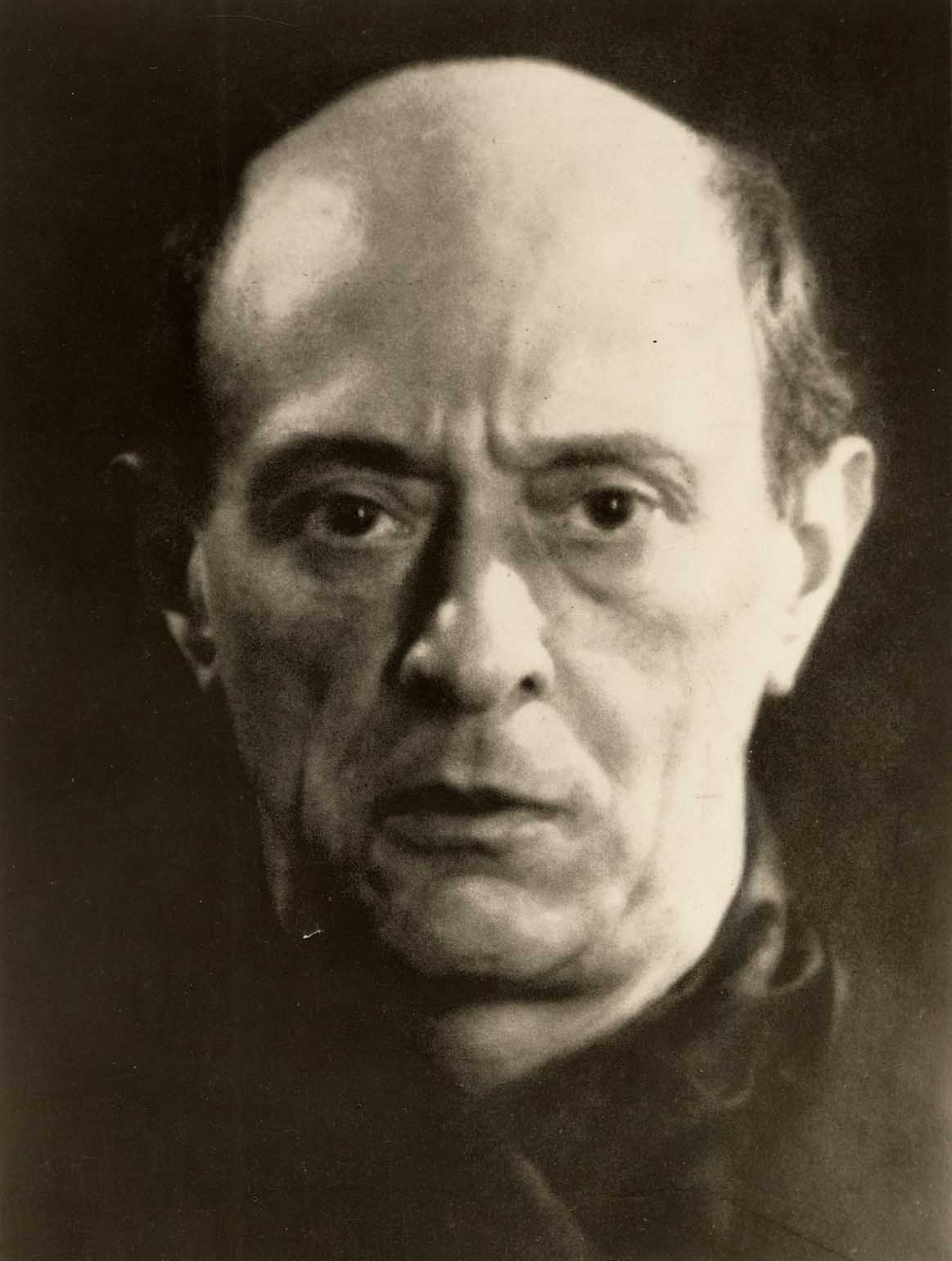
Arnold Schoenberg, 1927, by Man Ray

Pelleas und Melisande, Op. 5, is a symphonic poem written by Arnold Schoenberg and completed in February 1903. It was premiered on 25 January 1905 at the Musikverein in Vienna under the composer's direction in a concert that also included the first performance of Alexander von Zemlinsky's Die Seejungfrau. The work is based on Maurice Maeterlinck's play Pelléas and Mélisande, a subject suggested by Richard Strauss. When he began composing the work in 1902, Schoenberg was unaware that Claude Debussy's opera, also based on Maeterlinck's play, was about to premiere in Paris.

== Instrumentation ==
The symphonic poem is scored for a large orchestra with the following instruments.

Woodwinds

piccolo
3 flutes (3rd doubling 2nd piccolo)
3 oboes (3rd doubling 2nd English horn)
English horn
E♭ clarinet
3 clarinets in B♭ and A (3rd doubling 2nd bass clarinet)
bass clarinet
3 bassoons
contrabassoon

Brass

8 horns in F
4 trumpets in E and F
alto trombone
4 tenor-bass trombones
tuba

Percussion

timpani (2 players)

triangle
cymbals
tam-tam
large tenor drum
bass drum
glockenspiel

Strings

4 harps

violins I
violins II
violas
cellos
double basses

== Structure ==
The work is in the key of D minor, and is an example of Schoenberg's early tonal works. It is one continuous movement which comprises many inter-related sections. The major sections are delineated by the following tempo markings:

- Die Achtel ein wenig bewegt – zögernd
- Heftig
- Lebhaft
- Sehr rasch
- Ein wenig bewegt
- Langsam
- Ein wenig bewegter
- Sehr langsam
- Etwas bewegt
- In gehender Bewegung
- Breit

Alban Berg provided a formal outline demonstrating a combination four-movement symphonic form and a single movement sonata form with connections to scenes from the Maeterlinck play.

Sonata form	Introduction (0), First theme group (5), Transition (6) Second theme group (9), short recapitulation (14)	The forest, Marriage of Golaud and Melisande, Pelleas, Awakening of love in Melisande
Scherzo and episodes	Scherzo (16), episode 1 (25), episode 2 (30)	Scene at the fountain, Scene at the tower, Scene in the vaults
Slow movement	Introduction (33), Love Scene (36), Coda (48)	Fountain in the park, Love Scene, Death of Pelleas
Finale/recapitulation	Recapitulation of introduction to first movement (50), principal theme (55), love theme (56), epilogue with further recapitulation(62)	Melisande's death

Theme groups, similar to the leitmotif, which are associated with individual scenes or people, form the building-blocks of a symphonic development, which has its beginning in the forest scene introducing the first movement, where Golaud meets Melisande and they marry, and continues on through the inner segments of the Scherzo, which portrays the scene at the fountain where Melisande loses her wedding ring and encounters with Golaud's half-brother Pelleas, and Adagio, which portrays the farewell and love scene of Pelleas and Melisande, where Golaud kills Pelleas, and leads to the recapitulation of the thematic material in the Finale, which portrays the death of Melisande. In a letter to his brother-in-law, Alexander Zemlinsky, who wanted to make cuts in Pelleas for a Prague performance he was to conduct in 1918, Schoenberg summarized the fundamental anchoring points of this work: "the opening motif (12/8) is linked to Melisande", which is followed by the "fate motif", and the Scherzo contains "the game with the ring", the Adagio the "scene with Melisande's Hair", and the "love scene; ... the dying Melisande" and "entrance of the ladies in waiting, Melisande's death" in the finale.

Melisande's themes are based on a three-note motive

common to several themes in the work.

The first Melisande theme is followed immediately by the "fate" theme.

After a forceful statement of the fate theme Pelleas' motif (which contains the three note motive from Melisande's theme) is introduced.

Influenced by Pillar of Fire, a ballet version of his Verklärte Nacht by Antony Tudor, which premiered in 1942 in New York, Schoenberg, in American exile, decided for commercial reasons to modify and arrange the work's score for ballet as well, by expanding the one-movement symphonic poem into a multi-movement suite. He first spoke of this in early 1947 in a letter to his son-in-law Felix Greissle. However, the project collapsed due to the intervention of Associated Music Publishers, who managed to prevent authorization.

== Selected discography ==
- Pelleas und Melisande (coupled with Variationen für Orchester op.31). Chicago Symphony Orchestra / Pierre Boulez. Erato 2292-45827-2 (1992).
- Pelléas und Mélisande (coupled with Pelléas et Mélisande Suite op. 80 by Gabriel Fauré). Saint Louis Symphony Orchestra / Hans Vonk. PENTATONE PTC 5186324 (2008).
- Pelleas und Melisande (coupled with Erwartung op.17). Bergen Philharmonic Orchestra / Edward Gardner. Chandos – CHSA 5198 (2020).
