= Carmel Quartet =

Israeli string quartet

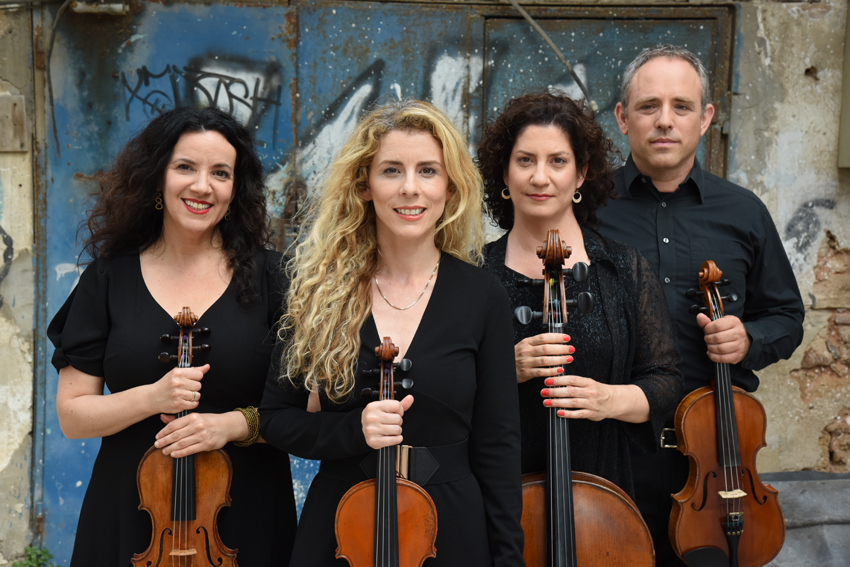
The Carmel Quartet in 2019

Bela Bartok String quartet number 2, second movement
Performed by the Carmel Quartet in 2007

Felix Mendelssohn Op13 third movement
Performed by the Carmel Quartet in 2007

Arnold Schoenberg Quartet No. 2 4th movement
Performed by the Carmel Quartet, with soprano Rona Israel-Kolatt, in 2007

The Carmel Quartet is a string quartet based in Israel. The quartet curates and self-produces its flagship lecture-presentation series "Strings and More" which features great chamber works given within a historic and literary context. Members of the quartet are Rachel Ringelstein and Tali Goldberg, violins, Yoel Greenberg viola, and Tami Waterman, cello.

The Carmel Quartet performed and recorded quartets by Israeli composers Paul Ben-Haim, Erich Walter Sternberg, Josef Tal, Yinam Leef, Noam Sheriff, Gideon Lewensohn, Carmel Raz and Uri Netanel, and it has given world- and Israeli premieres, including works by Yehezkel Braun, Menachem Zur, Ben-Haim, Yinam Leef, and Uri Brener.

The Carmel Quartet has performed with internationally renowned musicians such as violinists Gidon Kremer and Nikolai Znaider, violist Tabea Zimmermann, pianists Ian Fountain and Pnina Salzman, guitarist Emanuele Segre and cantor Alberto Mizrahi.

The quartet has performed in England, Austria, Italy, Greece, Switzerland, and China, and throughout Israel. Of its debut in Carnegie Hall, New York, in November 2004, The New York Times critic Allan Kozinn wrote, "At its best, the group played with precision, drive and unity of purpose."

Founded in 1999, the quartet has won awards in a number of prestigious competitions, including first prize in the "Prague-Vienna-Budapest" international competition in Austria, and the Israeli Aviv competition for chamber music and performance of an Israeli work in 2004. The quartet has studied with members of the Alban Berg Quartet, Isaac Stern, Miriam Fried, and Rivka Golani.
