= Patricia Carpenter (music theorist) =

Music theorist (1923–2000)

Patricia Carpenter (January 21, 1923 – July 8, 2000), a music theorist, was a professor of music theory at Barnard College and Columbia University. Her areas of scholarly interest included music theory, the history of music theory, musical analysis, and the aesthetics of music. She was born in Santa Rosa, California.

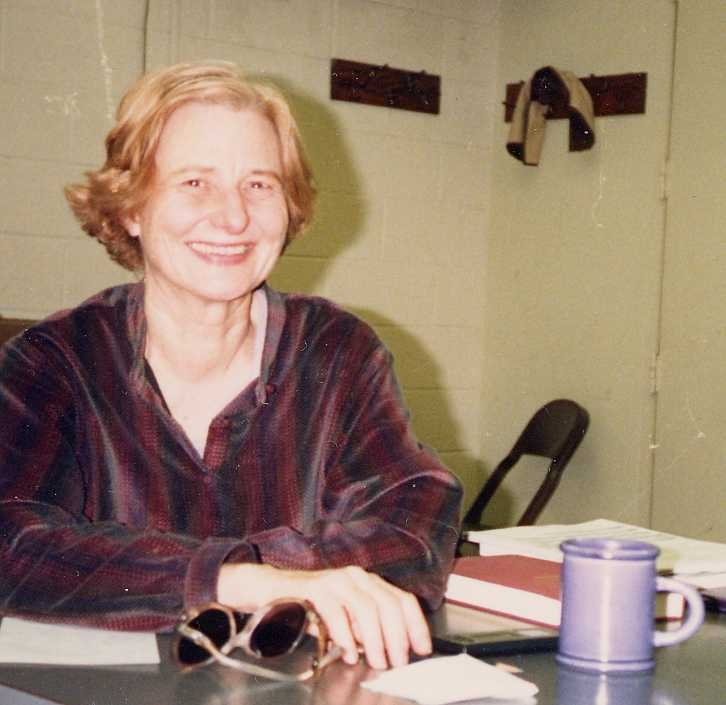
Patricia Carpenter

== Career ==
She studied several instruments, primarily piano with Ethel Leginska, as well as percussion, bassoon, and conducting. She conducted the San Bernardino Symphony. Learning of Arnold Schoenberg from Leginska, she wrote asking him for lessons (correspondence is preserved in the Arnold Schoenberg Center in Vienna). From 1942 to 1949 she studied with Schoenberg, and in 1944 she gave the Los Angeles premiere of his Piano Concerto in the two-piano version.

She was initially accepted into the composition program at Columbia University to study with Douglas Moore, and her compositions included several chamber and orchestra works. Under the supervision of Albert Hofstadter in philosophy and Paul Henry Lang in musicology, she embarked upon studies in the aesthetics and history of music. She completed her Ph.D. in Music and Philosophy at Columbia in 1972.

The first woman to present a keynote address to the Society of Music Theory, she served as its Vice-President from 1992 to 1994. She retired in 1989. The Music Theory Society of New York State holds an annual competition for an emerging scholar award named after her.

== Selected works ==
- "Musical Form Regained," The Journal of Philosophy 62 (1965): 36-48.
- "On the Meaning of Music," Art and Philosophy: A Symposium, Sydney Hook, ed. New York: New York University Press, 1966.
- "The Musical Object," Current Musicology 5 (1967): 56-87. Responses in Current Musicology 6 (1968): 116-25. Reprinted in The Garland Library of the History of Western Music, ed. Ellen Rosand. New York: Garland Publishing, 1985.
- "The Janus-Aspect of Fugue: an Essay in the Phenomenology of Musical Form," (Ph.D. Dissertation, Columbia University, 1972).
- "Tonal Coherence in a Motet of Dufay," Journal of Music Theory 17 (1973):2-65.
- "Grundgestalt as Tonal Function," Music Theory Spectrum 5 (1983):15-38.
- "Musical Form and the Musical Idea: Reflections on a Theme of Schoenberg, Hanslick, and Kant," in Music and Civilization: Essays in Honor of Paul Henry Lang, E. Strainchamps and M.R. Manniates, eds. New York: W.W. Norton, 1985.
- "Aspects of Musical Space," in Explorations in Music, the Arts and Ideas: Essays in Honor of Leonard B. Meyer. New York: Pendragon Press, 1988.
- "Music Theory and Aesthetic Form," Studies in Music from the University of Western Ontario 13 (1991):21-47.
- "Arnheim and the Teaching of Music," The Journal of Aesthetic Education 27 (1993): 105-114.
- “Review, William Thomson, Schoenberg's Error, Music Theory Spectrum 15 (1993):286-299.
- "Schoenberg's Philosophy of Composition," in The Arnold Schoenberg Companion, ed. Walter B. Bailey. Westport, CT: Greenwood Publishing Group, (1998), 209-222.
- The Musical Idea and the Art, Logic and Technique of its Presentation. A Theoretical Manuscript by Arnold Schoenberg. Edited and translated by Patricia Carpenter and Severine Neff, with a Commentary and Concordance of Terms. New York: Columbia University Press, 1995. Reprint edition (paperback): 2006. Bloomington, Indiana University Press. With a new foreword by Walter Frisch.
