= Combinatoriality =

Concept in music

In music using the twelve tone technique, combinatoriality is a quality shared by twelve-tone tone rows whereby each section of a row and a proportionate number of its transformations combine to form aggregates (all twelve tones). Much as the pitches of an aggregate created by a tone row do not need to occur simultaneously, the pitches of a combinatorially created aggregate need not occur simultaneously. Arnold Schoenberg, creator of the twelve-tone technique, often combined P-0/I-5 to create "two aggregates, between the first hexachords of each, and the second hexachords of each, respectively."

Combinatoriality is a side effect of derived rows, where the initial segment or set may be combined with its transformations (T,R,I,RI) to create an entire row. "Derivation refers to a process whereby, for instance, the initial trichord of a row can be used to arrive at a new, 'derived' row by employing the standard twelve-tone operations of transposition, inversion, retrograde, and retrograde-inversion."

Combinatorial properties are not dependent on the order of the notes within a set, but only on the content of the set, and combinatoriality may exist between three tetrachordal and between four trichordal sets, as well as between pairs of hexachords, and six dyads. A complement in this context is half of a combinatorial pitch class set and most generally it is the "other half" of any pair including pitch class sets, textures, or pitch range.

== Definition ==
Most generally complementation is the separation of pitch-class collections into two complementary sets, one containing the pitch classes not in the other. More restrictively complementation is "the process of pairing entities on either side of a center of symmetry".

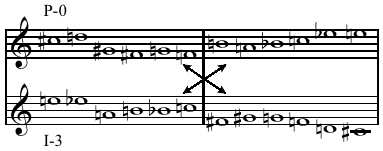
Combinatorial tone rows from Moses und Aron by Arnold Schoenberg pairing complementary hexachords from P-0/I-3

The term, "'combinatorial' appears to have been first applied to twelve-tone music by Milton Babbitt" in 1950, when he published a review of René Leibowitz's books Schoenberg et son école and Qu’est-ce que la musique de douze sons? Babbitt also introduced the term derived row.

== Hexachordal combinatoriality ==
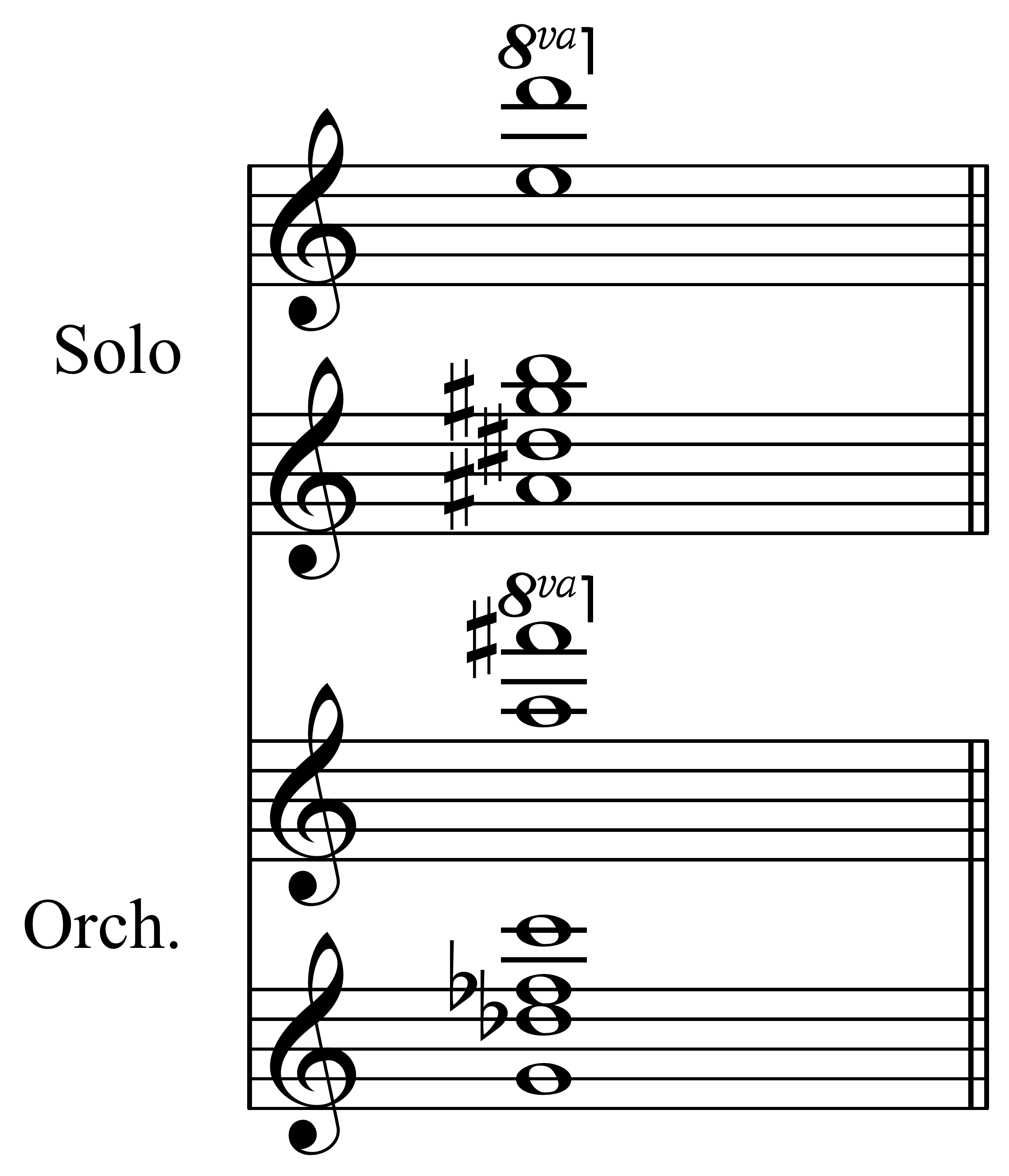
Combinatorial all-trichord hexachords from Elliott Carter's Piano Concerto, mm. 59–60

A 12-tone row has hexachordal combinatoriality with another 12-tone row if their respective first (as well as second, because a 12-tone row itself forms an aggregate by definition) hexachords form an aggregate.

There are four main types of combinatoriality. A hexachord may be:

- Prime combinatorial (transposition)
- Retrograde combinatorial (retrograde)
- Inversional combinatorial (inversion)
- Retrograde-inversional combinatorial (retrograde-inversion)

and thus:

- Semi-combinatorial (by one of the above)
- All-combinatorial (by all)

Prime (transpositional) combinatoriality of a hexachord refers to the property of a hexachord whereby it forms an aggregate with one or more of its transpositions. Alternatively, transpositional combinatoriality is the lack of shared pitch classes between a hexachord and one or more of its transpositions. For example, 0 2 4 6 8 t, and its transposition up one semitone (+1): 1 3 5 7 9 e, have no notes in common.

Retrograde hexachordal combinatoriality is considered trivial, since any row has retrograde hexachordal combinatoriality with itself (all tone rows have retrograde combinatoriality).

Inversional combinatoriality is a relationship between two rows, a principal row and its inversion. The principal row's first half, or six notes, are the inversion's last six notes, though not necessarily in the same order. Thus, the first half of each row is the other's complement. The same conclusion applies to each row's second half as well. When combined, these rows still maintain a fully chromatic feeling and don't tend to reinforce certain pitches as tonal centers as might happen with freely combined rows. For example, the row from Schoenberg's Moses und Aron, above contains: 0 1 4 5 6 7, this inverts to: 0 e 8 7 6 5, add three = 2 3 8 9 t e.

01  4567     : 1st hexachord P0/2nd hexachord I3
  23    89te : 2nd hexachord P0/1st hexachord I3
complete chromatic scale

Retrograde-inversional combinatoriality is a lack of shared pitches between the hexachords of a row and its retrograde-inversion.

Babbitt also described the semi-combinatorial row and the all-combinatorial row, the latter being a row which is combinatorial with any of its derivations and their transpositions. Semi-combinatorial sets are sets whose hexachords are capable of forming an aggregate with one of its basic transformations (R, I, RI) transposed. There are thirteen hexachords that are semi-combinatorial by inversion only.

(0)  0 1 2 3 4 6 // e t 9 8 7 5
(1)  0 1 2 3 5 7 // e t 9 8 6 4
(2)  0 1 2 3 6 7 // e t 9 8 5 4
(3)  0 1 2 4 5 8 // e t 9 7 6 3
(4)  0 1 2 4 6 8 // e t 9 7 5 3
(5)  0 1 2 5 7 8 // e t 9 6 4 3
(6)  0 1 3 4 6 9 // e t 8 7 5 2
(7)  0 1 3 5 7 9 // e t 8 6 4 2
(8)  0 1 3 5 8 9 // 7 6 4 2 e t
(9)  0 1 3 6 7 9 // e t 8 5 4 2
(10) 0 1 4 5 6 8 // 3 2 e t 9 7
(11) 0 2 3 4 6 8 // 1 e t 9 7 5
(12) 0 2 3 5 7 9 // 1 e t 8 6 4

Any hexachord which contains a zero in its interval vector possesses transpositional combinatoriality (in other words: to achieve combinatoriality a hexachord cannot be transposed by an interval equaling a note it contains). For example, there is one hexachord which is combinatorial by transposition (T6):

(0) 0 1 3 4 5 8 // 6 7 9 t e 2

Neither hexachord contains tritones.

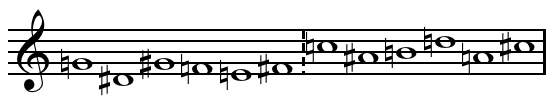
Gruppen's main first-order all-combinatorial tone row, though this property is not exploited compositionally in that work.

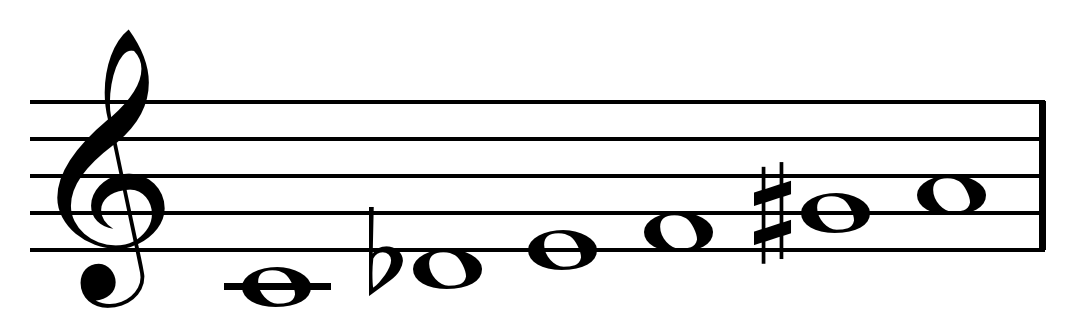
"Ode-to-Napoleon" hexachord in prime form One of Babbitt's six all-combinatorial hexachord "source sets".

All-combinatorial sets are sets whose hexachords are capable of forming an aggregate with any of its basic transformations transposed. There are six source sets, or basic hexachordally all-combinatorial sets, each hexachord of which may be reordered within itself:

(A)  0 1 2 3 4 5 // 6 7 8 9 t e
(B)  0 2 3 4 5 7 // 6 8 9 t e 1
(C)  0 2 4 5 7 9 // 6 8 t e 1 3
(D)  0 1 2 6 7 8 // 3 4 5 9 t e
(E)  0 1 4 5 8 9 // 2 3 6 7 t e
(F)  0 2 4 6 8 t // 1 3 5 7 9 e

Note: t = 10, e = 11.

Because the first three sets (A, B, and C) each satisfy all four criteria for just one transpositional value, set D satisfies them for two transpositional values, E for three values, and F, for six transpositions, Babbitt designates these four groups as "first-order", "second-order", "third-order", and "sixth-order" all-combinatorial hexachords, respectively. Notice that the first set, set "A," is the first six notes of an ascending chromatic scale, and that the last set, set "F," is a whole-tone scale.

Combinatoriality may be used to create an aggregate of all twelve tones, though the term often refers simply to combinatorial rows stated together.

Hexachordal combinatoriality is a concept in post-tonal theory that describes the combination of hexachords, often used in reference to the music of the Second Viennese school. In music that consistently utilizes all twelve chromatic tones (particularly twelve-tone and serial music), the aggregate (collection of all 12 pitch classes) may be divided into two hexachords (collections of 6 pitches). This breaks the aggregate into two smaller pieces, thus making it easier to sequence notes, progress between rows or aggregates, and combine notes and aggregates.

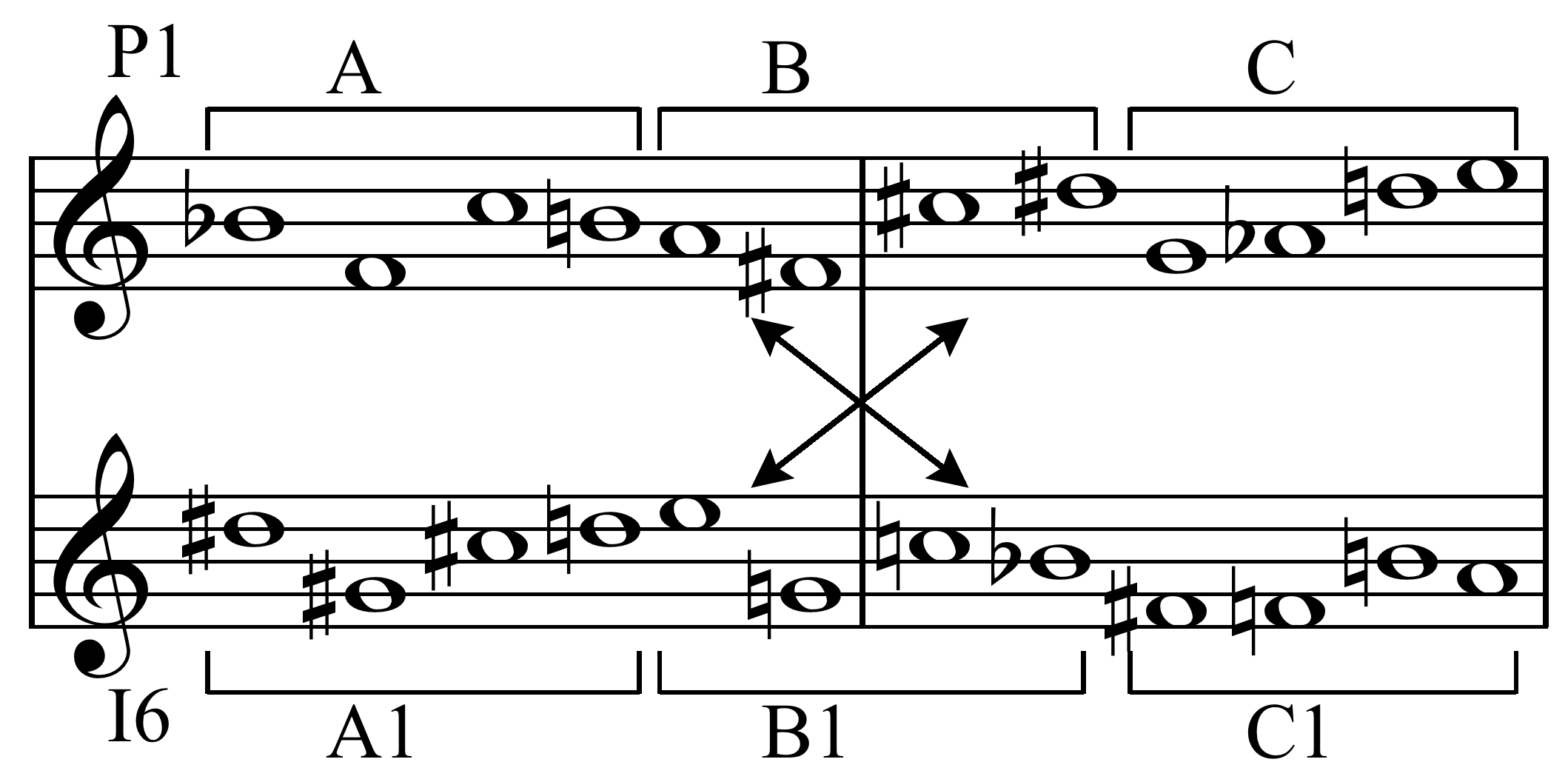
The principal forms, P1 and I6, of Schoenberg's Piano Piece, op. 33a, tone row feature hexachordal combinatoriality and contains three perfect fifths each, which is the relation between P1 and I6.

Occasionally a hexachord may be combined with an inverted or transposed version of itself in a special case which will then result in the aggregate (complete set of 12 chromatic pitches).

A row (B♭=0: 0 6 8 5 7 e 4 3 9 t 1 2) used by Schoenberg may be divided into two hexachords:

B♭ E  F♯ E♭ F  A // D  C♯ G  G♯ B  C

When you invert the first hexachord and transpose it, the following hexachord, a reordering of the second hexachord, results:

G  C♯ B  D  C  G♯ = D  C♯ G  G♯ B  C

Thus, when you superimpose the original hexachord 1 (P0) over the transposed inversion of hexachord 1 (I9 in this case), the entire collection of 12 pitches results. If you continued the rest of the transposed, inverted row (I9) and superimposed original hexachord 2, you would again have the full complement of 12 chromatic pitches.

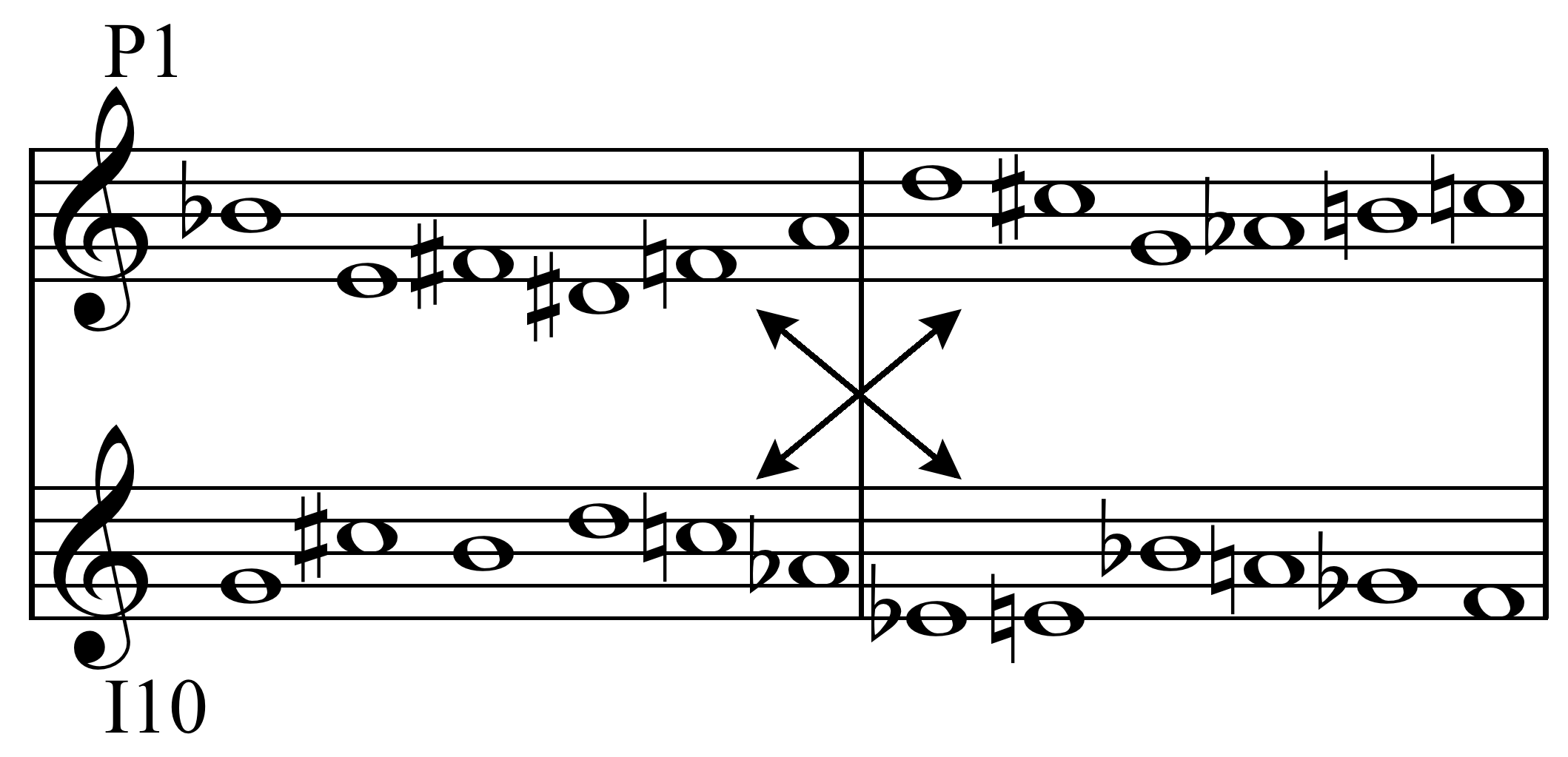
In Schoenberg's Variations for Orchestra, Op. 31, tone row form P1's second half has the same notes, in a different order, as the first half of I10: "Thus it is possible to employ P1 and I10 simultaneously and in parallel motion without causing note doubling."

Hexachordal combinatoriality is closely related to the theory of the 44 tropes created by Josef Matthias Hauer in 1921, although it seems that Hauer had no influence on Babbitt at all. Furthermore, there is little proof suggesting that Hauer had extensive knowledge about the inversional properties of the tropes earlier than 1942 at least. The earliest records on combinatorial relations of hexachords, however, can be found amongst the theoretical writings of the Austrian composer and music theorist Othmar Steinbauer. (Note: Steinbauer (1895–1962) was a former student of Arnold Schoenberg and Josef Matthias Hauer. See Steinbauer article on de.wikipedia.org.) He undertook elaborate studies on the trope system in the early 1930s which are documented in an unpublished typescript Klang- und Meloslehre (1932). Steinbauer's materials dated between 1932 and 1934 contain comprehensive data on combinatorial trichords, tetrachords and hexachords including semi-combinatorial and all-combinatorial sets. They may therefore be the earliest records in music history. A compilation of Steinbauer's morphological material has in parts become publicly available in 1960 with his script Lehrbuch der Klangreihenkomposition (author's edition) and was reprinted in 2001.

== Trichordal combinatoriality ==
Tone row for Webern's Concerto for Nine Instruments Op. 24.
An all-combinatorial derived row composed of four trichords: P RI R I.

Trichordal combinatoriality is a row's ability to form aggregates through the combination of trichords. "Trichordal combinatoriality involves the simultaneous presentation of four rows in parcels of three pcs." The existence of trichordal combinatoriality, or any other form, in a row does not preclude the existence of other forms of combinatoriality (at the least trivial hexachordal combinatoriality exists between every row form and its retrograde). All trichordally derived rows possess trichordal combinatoriality.
