= Derived row =

In music using the twelve-tone technique, derivation is the construction of a row through segments. A derived row is a tone row whose entirety of twelve tones is constructed from a segment or portion of the whole, the generator. Anton Webern often used derived rows in his pieces. A partition is a segment created from a set through partitioning.

== Derivation ==
Rows may be derived from a sub-set of any number of pitch classes that is a divisor of 12, the most common being the first three pitches or a trichord. This segment may then undergo transposition, inversion, retrograde, or any combination to produce the other parts of the row (in this case, the other three segments).

One of the side effects of derived rows is invariance. For example, since a segment may be equivalent to the generating segment inverted and transposed, say, 6 semitones, when the entire row is inverted and transposed six semitones the generating segment will now consist of the pitch classes of the derived segment.

Here is a row derived from a trichord taken from Webern's Concerto, Op. 24:

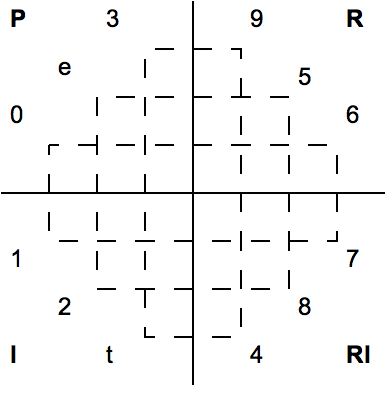
Symmetry diagram of Webern's Op. 24 row, after Pierre Boulez (2002).

The mirror symmetry may clearly be seen in this representation of the Op. 24 tone row where each trichord (P RI R I) is in a rectangle and the axes of symmetry (between P & RI and R & I) are marked in red.

P represents the original trichord, RI, retrograde and inversion, R retrograde, and I inversion.

The entire row, if B=0, is:

- 0, 11, 3, 4, 8, 7, 9, 5, 6, 1, 2, 10.

For instance, the third trichord:

- 9, 5, 6

is the first trichord:

- 0, 11, 3

backwards:

- 3, 11, 0

and transposed 6

- 3+6, 11+6, 0+6 = 9, 5, 6 mod 12.

Combinatoriality is often a result of derived rows. For example, the Op. 24 row is all-combinatorial, P0 being hexachordally combinatorial with P6, R0, I5, and RI11.

== Partition and mosaic ==
The opposite is partitioning, the use of methods to create segments from entire sets, most often through registral difference.

In music using the twelve-tone technique a partition is "a collection of disjunct, unordered pitch-class sets that comprise an aggregate". It is a method of creating segments from sets, most often through registral difference, the opposite of derivation used in derived rows.

More generally, in musical set theory partitioning is the division of the domain of pitch class sets into types, such as transpositional type, see equivalence class and cardinality.

Partition is also an old name for types of compositions in several parts; there is no fixed meaning, and in several cases the term was reportedly interchanged with various other terms.

A cross-partition is, "a two-dimensional configuration of pitch classes whose columns are realized as chords, and whose rows are differentiated from one another by registral, timbral, or other means." This allows, "slot-machine transformations that reorder the vertical trichords but keep the pitch classes in their columns."

A mosaic is "a partition that divides the aggregate into segments of equal size", according to Martino (1961). "Kurth 1992 and Mead 1988 use mosaic and mosaic class in the way that I use partition and mosaic", are used here. However later, he says that, "the DS determines the number of distinct partitions in a mosaic, which is the set of partitions related by transposition and inversion."

=== Inventory ===
The first useful characteristic of a partition, an inventory, is the set classes produced by the union of the constituent pitch class sets of a partition. For trichords and hexachords combined see Alegant 1993, Babbitt 1955, Dubiel 1990, Mead 1994, Morris and Alegant 1988, Morris 1987, and Rouse 1985.

=== Degree of symmetry ===
The second useful characteristic of a partition, the degree of symmetry (DS), "specifies the number of operations that preserve the unordered pcsets of a partition; it tells the extent to which that partition's pitch-class sets map into (or onto) each other under transposition or inversion."
