= Variations for Orchestra (Schoenberg) =

1928 set of works by Arnold Schönberg

- by Arnold Schoenberg
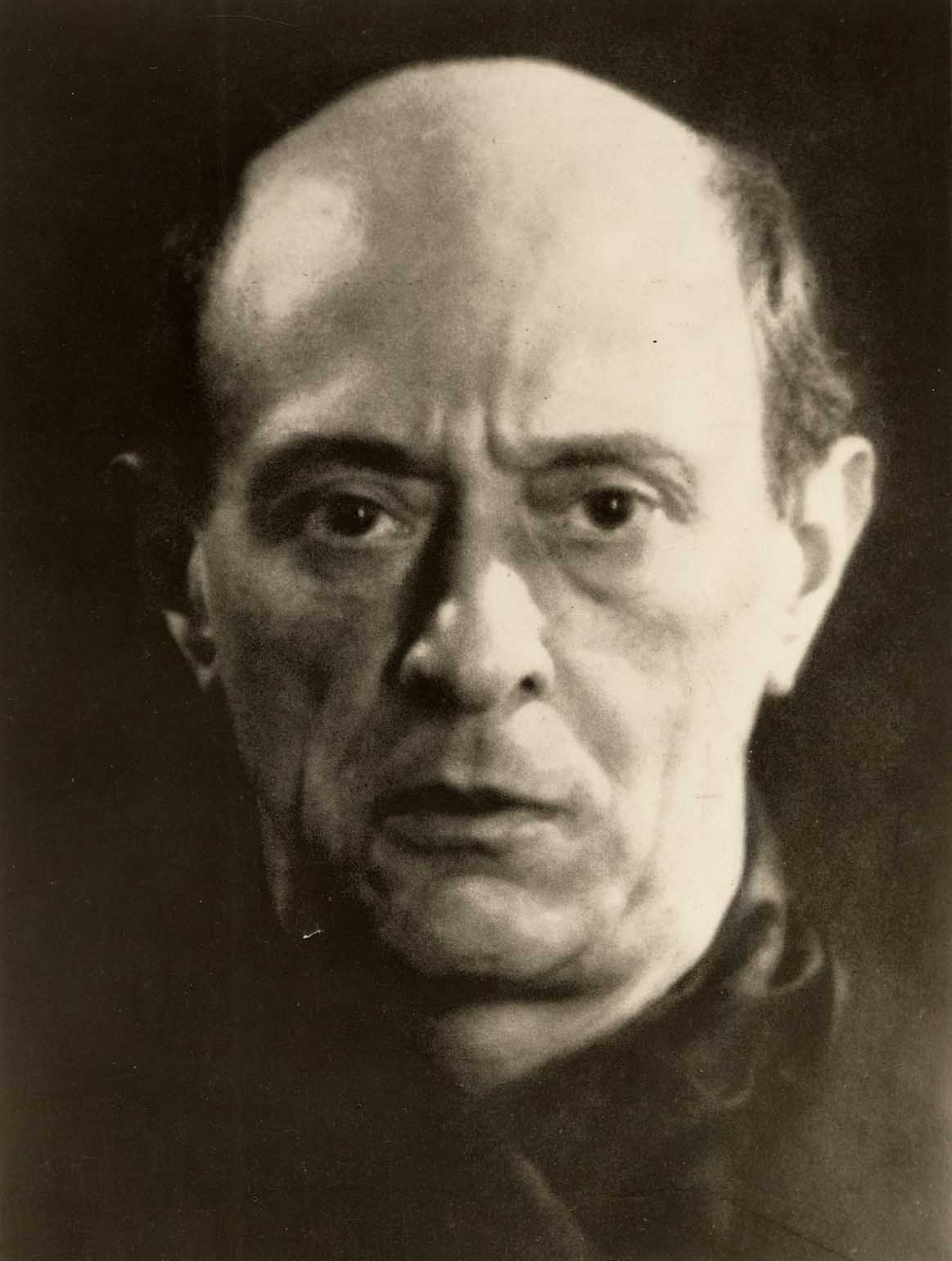
- Arnold Schoenberg in 1927 by Man Ray
- Native name: German: Variationen für Orchester
- Style: Twelve-tone technique
- Composed: 1926 – 1928: Germany
- Movements: 12 sections

Premiere
- Date: December 1928
- Location: Berlin
- Conductor: Wilhelm Furtwängler
- Performers: Berlin Philharmonic

Variations for Orchestra, Op. 31 (1926–28) is an orchestral set of variations on a theme, composed by Arnold Schoenberg and is his first twelve-tone composition for a large ensemble. Premiered in December 1928 by the Berlin Philharmonic conducted by Wilhelm Furtwängler, it was greeted by a tumultuous scandal.

== Sections ==
1. Introduction
2. Theme
3. Variation I: Moderato
4. Variation II: Adagio
5. Variation III: Mässig
6. Variation IV: Walzer-tempo
7. Variation V: Bewegt
8. Variation VI: Andante
9. Variation VII: Langsam
10. Variation VIII: Sehr rasch
11. Variation IX: L'istesso Tempo
12. Finale

== Music ==
The instrumentation of the works consists of 4 flutes (2nd and 3rd doubling piccolo), 4 oboes (4th doubling english horn), 4 clarinets (4th doubling bass clarinet), E-flat clarinet, 4 bassoons (4th doubling contrabassoon), 4 horns, 3 trumpets, 4 trombones, tuba, timpani, percussion (cymbals, bass drum, snare drum, tam-tam, triangle, tambourine, glockenspiel, xylophone, flexatone), harp, celeste, mandolin, and strings

The theme of the piece is stated in measures 34–57. The orchestration includes a flexatone. The piece features the BACH motif (B♭–A–C–B♮). The tone row in its four permutations (labeled Prime, Retrograde, Inversion, and Retrograde Inversion) are shown below.

Schoenberg opened a lecture on the composition with the following tyranny of the majority defense of less common aesthetics: "Far be it from me to question the rights of the majority. But one thing is certain: somewhere there is a limit to the power of the majority; it occurs, in fact, wherever the essential step is one that cannot be taken by all and sundry."

The piece has been arranged for two pianos by Charles Wuorinen and this arrangement was set to a ballet, Schoenberg Variations (1996), by Richard Tanner of the New York City Ballet.
