= Michael Brenson =

American art critic (born 1943)

- Born: 1943 (age 81–82)
- Education: Rutgers University (BA); Johns Hopkins University (MA; PhD)
- Occupations: Art critic; curator
- Years active: 1974–present

Michael Brenson (born 1943) is an American art critic and curator. From 1982 to 1991, Brenson worked as a critic for The New York Times.

== Early life and education ==
Michael Brenson was born in 1943. He was raised in New York and traveled often to Paris with his father.

Brenson attended Rutgers University, graduating with a BA in sculpture. He later received an MA in creative writing from Johns Hopkins University, followed by a PhD in art history from Johns Hopkins in 1974.

== Career ==
Immediately after receiving his PhD, Brenson moved to Paris to teach and write, eventually publishing art reviews in the International Herald Tribune. He returned to the United States in 1982 to work for The New York Times first as an art reporter and then an art critic. Brenson worked at the Times for nine years.

In 2000, Brenson joined the faculty of Bard College's curatorial studies department. In 2001, he published Visionaries and Outcasts, a book exploring the legacy of the various culture wars in American politics involving the National Endowment for the Arts.

In 2022, Brenson published a biography of the artist David Smith.

== Awards ==
Brenson was awarded a Guggenheim Fellowship in 2008.

== Publications ==
=== Books ===
- Brenson, Michael (2001). Visionaries and Outcasts: The NEA, Congress, and the Place of the Visual Artist in America. New York: The New Press. ISBN 9781565846241. OCLC 44174242.
- Brenson, Michael (2004). Acts of Engagement: Writings on Art, Criticism, and Institutions, 1993–2002. Lanham, Maryland: Rowman & Littlefield. ISBN 9780742529816. OCLC 54817522.
- Brenson, Michael (2022). David Smith: The Art and Life of a Transformational Sculptor. New York: Farrar, Straus and Giroux. ISBN 9780374281465. OCLC 1289246600.
- Brenson, Michael; Anastas, Rhea, eds. (2006). Witness to Her Art: Art and Writings by Adrian Piper, Mona Hatoum, Cady Noland, Jenny Holzer, Kara Walker, Daniela Rossell, and Eau de Cologne. Annandale-on-Hudson, New York: Center for Curatorial Studies, Bard College. ISBN 9781931493550. OCLC 80597295.
- Brenson, Michael; Jacob, Mary Jane, eds. (1998). Conversations at the Castle: Changing Audiences and Contemporary Art. Cambridge, Massachusetts: MIT Press. ISBN 9780262100724. OCLC 38216516.

=== Chapters ===
- Brenson, Michael (1993). "Lynch Fragments". In Gedeon, Lucinda H. (ed.). Melvin Edwards Sculpture: A Thirty-Year Retrospective, 1963–1993. Purchase, New York / Seattle: Neuberger Museum of Art / University of Washington Press. pp. 20–33. ISBN 9780295973005. OCLC 28161746.
- Brenson, Michael (1998). "Elizabeth Catlett's Sculptural Aesthetics". In Gedeon, Lucinda H. (ed.). Elizabeth Catlett Sculpture: A Fifty-Year Retrospective. Purchase, New York / Seattle: Neuberger Museum of Art / University of Washington Press. ISBN 9780295977225. OCLC 38962438.
- Brenson, Michael (1998). "Joel Shapiro and Figurative Sculpture". In Teicher, Hendel (ed.). Joel Shapiro: Sculpture and Drawings. New York: Harry N. Abrams. ISBN 9780810941786. OCLC 37432707.
