= Timothy Madigan =

Timothy J. Madigan (born 1962) is an American philosopher, author and editor, and a noted humanist. He is particularly notable for having been the editor of Free Inquiry, a leading journal of secular humanist discussion and commentary.

Madigan graduated in philosophy from the State University of New York at Buffalo in 1984, later gaining an MA and a PhD from the same institution. His PhD supervisor was Peter Hare. Madigan's PhD was on the 19th century mathematician and philosopher William Kingdon Clifford, and he wrote a 2009 book about Clifford.

From the mid-1980s Madigan was employed by the journal Free Inquiry. He became its Executive Editor (1987–1996) and then Editor (1996-1998). He left to become the Editorial Director of the University of Rochester Press, in Rochester, New York. He is currently Professor and Chair of the Philosophy Department at St John Fisher College, also in Rochester, NY. Madigan is also one of the US Editors of Philosophy Now magazine.

As Secular Humanist Mentor of the Council for Secular Humanism, Madigan was active in helping establish local secular humanist societies throughout the United States. Since 1993 he has been a member of the board of directors of the Bertrand Russell Society. In 2015 he was elected President of the Bertrand Russell Society. Madigan is a frequent speaker and panel chair at academic conferences on a wide range of humanities subjects. His own advice on chairing conference sessions has been published in Academe, the journal of the American Association of University Professors.

== Books ==
- The Question of Humanism with David Goicoechea and John Luik (1991)
- The Ethics of Belief and Other Essays by William Kingdon Clifford edited by Timothy J. Madigan (1999)
- Promethean Love, edited by Timothy J. Madigan, Cambridge Scholars Press, 2006.
- God and the Philosophers, by Paul Edwards edited by Timothy J. Madigan, Prometheus Books, 2008.
- W.K. Clifford and "The Ethics of Belief", by Timothy J. Madigan, Cambridge Scholars Press, 2009.
- Lucretius: His Continuing Influence and Contemporary Relevance ed by David B. Suits and Timothy J. Madigan, RIT Cary Graphic Arts Press 2011
- Beyond Sustainability, (co-written with Tim Delaney), McFarland Publishing, 2014.
- The Sociology of Sports, 2nd Edition (co-written with Tim Delaney), McFarland Publishing, 2015.
- Lessons Learned from Popular Culture, (co-written with Tim Delaney), SUNY Press, 2016.
- Bertrand Russell, Public Intellectual, (co-edited with Peter Stone), Tiger Bark Press, 2016.
- Friendship and Happiness and the Connection Between Them, (co-written with Tim Delaney), McFarland Publishing, 2017.
