= Julie Ault =

American artist, curator, and editor (born 1957)

- Born: 1957 (age 68–69)
- Known for: Collaborative artist, curator
- Spouse: Andres Serrano (m. 1980, div. 2005)
- Awards: MacArthur Foundation Fellowship, 2018

Julie Ault (born 1957) is an American artist, curator, and editor who was a cofounder of Group Material, a New York-based artists' collaborative that has produced over fifty exhibitions and public projects exploring relationships between politics and aesthetics. She was awarded a MacArthur Fellows Program grant, commonly referred to as a MacArthur Genius Grant, in 2018 in recognition for her achievements "redefining the role of the artwork and the artist by melding artistic, curatorial, archival, editorial, and activist practices into a new form of cultural production."

== Artistic practice ==
As an artist, Ault works both individually and collaboratively with the artist Martin Beck for their contextual research projects. Their method can be regarded as an extended form of cultural praxis deriving from a general interest in the conservation and presentation of knowledge and culture. It questions the ways cultural economies present themselves.

Ault's and Beck's projects have been exhibited internationally, including the show Installation at Secession (Vienna, 2006), Social Landscape at the Weatherspoon Art Museum (Greensboro, NC, 2004) and Outdoor Systems, indoor distribution at the Neue Gesellschaft für Bildende Kunst, Berlin, 2000. Together they also have produced numerous exhibition designs, including over two dozen shows for the International Center of Photography in New York between 2001 and 2004; X-Screen: Film Installations and Actions of the 1960s and 1970s (2003) and Changing Channels: Art and Television 1963–1987 (2010) for Mumok – Museum Moderner Kunst Stiftung Ludwig, Vienna; Projekt Migration (2005) at Kölnischer Kunstverein, Cologne; and Jim Hodges: Give More Than You Take (2014) at the Hammer Museum, Los Angeles.

== Publishing ==
Recently, Ault has edited several books on arts and artists, with a specific focus on the New York City art scene of the 1980s and 1990s. Her most recent books include a monograph she edited on the work of Felix Gonzalez-Torres and a major publication on the art of Sister Corita, which received an extensive review on the group blog Design Observer. In 2013, the exhibitionTell It To My Heart: Collected by Julie Ault which included works from Ault's personal art collection opened at the Kunstmuseum Basel, Museum für Gegenwartskunst. Basel, Switzerland. Ault edited an accompanying catalogue published on the occasion of the exhibition with texts by Julie Ault, Marvin J. Taylor, Miguel Wandschneider, and Scott Cameron Weaver, the second volume of the catalogue was published in 2016. In 2018 a collection of her writing was published as In Parts: Writings by Julie Ault.

== Education and teaching activities ==
Julie Ault earned a B.A. from Hunter College of the City University of New York in 1995, and a Ph.D. from the Malmö Art Academy of Lund University in 2011.

She has taught at the École Supérieure d'Art Visuel in Geneva, UCLA, the Rhode Island School of Design, CalArts, the Bard Center for Curatorial Studies and Art in Contemporary Culture, Malmo Art Academy at Lund University, and the Cooper Union. In 2006–07 she taught at the Jutland Art Academy in Århus, Denmark by way of DIVA, the Danish International Visual Art Exchange Program.

== Personal life ==
Ault married photographer Andres Serrano in December, 1980. They separated in 1990 and divorced in 2005. Ault was born in Boston, MA. She currently lives and works in New York, NY and Joshua Tree, CA.

== Exhibitions ==
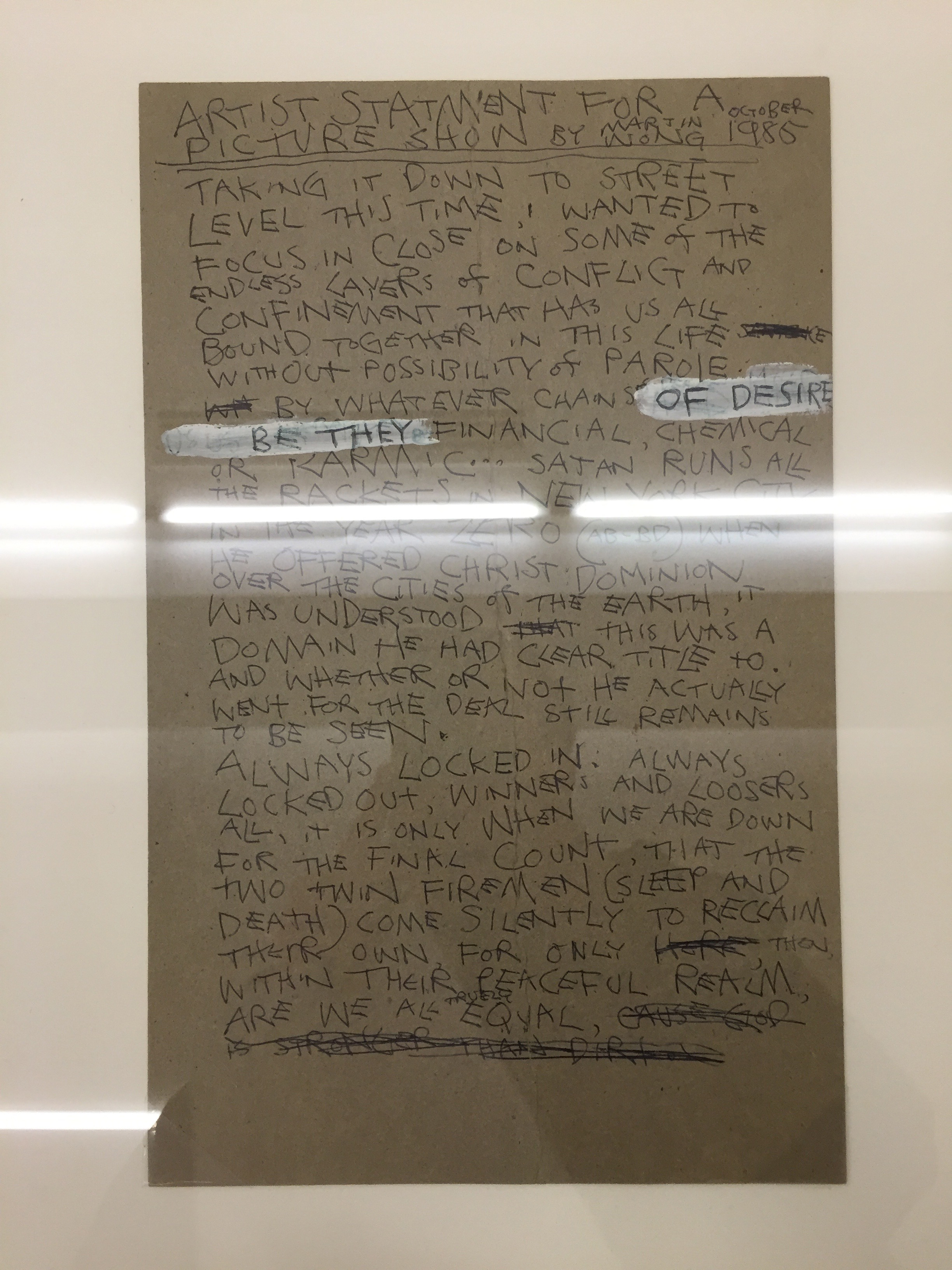
Martin Wong, Press Release for Semaphore Gallery, 1984. Featured in Ault's Afterlife and photographed at Buchholz Galerie in December 2015, New York.

- "Nancy Spero: Paper Mirror", Museo Tamayo, Mexico City and MoMA PS1, New York, NY (2018 and 2019)
- "Afterlife: a constellation", Whitney Museum of American Art, New York, NY, 2014
- Tell It To My Heart: Collected by Julie Ault. Kunstmuseum Basel, Museum für Gegenwartskunst. Basel, Switzerland. 2 Feb. – 12 May 2013. Cur. Julie Ault, Nikola Dietrich, Scott Cameron Weaver, Danh Vo, Jason Simon, Martin Beck, and Heinz Peter Knes. Catalogue. [Travels to Culturgest, Lisbon, Portugal. 21 Jun – 8 Sep. 2013; Artists Space, New York, NY. 24 Nov. 2013 – 23 Feb. 2014.]
- Installation, Secession, Vienna, 2006
- Information, Storefront for Art and Architecture, New York, NY, 2006
- Old News, LACE – Los Angeles Contemporary Exhibitions, Los Angeles, CA, 2005
- Points of Entry, for the City University of New York (CUNY), Queens, New York, 2004
- A Small Look at Giganticism, 2004
- Social Landscape, at the Weatherspoon Art Museum, Greensboro, NC, 2004
- Outdoor Systems, indoor distribution at the Neue Gesellschaft für Bildende Kunst, Berlin, 2000
- Billboard: Art on the Road, Massachusetts Museum of Contemporary Art – MASS MoCA, North Adams, MA, 1999

== Bibliography ==
- Show and Tell: A Chronicle of Group Material, Four Corners Books, 2010.
- Come Alive: The Spirited Art of Sister Corita, Four Corners Books, 2006.
- Felix Gonzalez-Torres, steidldangin, 2006.
- Cerith Wyn Evans: Cerith Wyn Evans, Lukas & Sternberg, 2004.
- Critical Condition: Selected Texts in Dialogue, together with Martin Beck, Zollverein | Zeitgenössische Kunst und Kritik, 2003.
- Alternative Art New York, 1965–1985, University of Minnesota Press, 2002.
- Art Matters : How the Culture Wars Changed America, New York Univ Press, 2000.
