= Martin Beck (artist) =

Visual artist

- Born: 1963 (age 62–63); Bludenz, Austria

Martin Beck (born 1963) is a visual artist based in New York and Vienna. His artworks often derive from in-depth research into narratives from the fields of architecture, design and popular culture and are characterized by his usage of diverse media, including installation, photography, video, writing, sculpture, and drawing. Beck also works collaboratively and has, since the late 1990s, co-authored various exhibitions, publications, and exhibit design projects with artist Julie Ault.

== Education and teaching ==
Martin Beck studied at the University of Applied Arts as well as at the Academy of Fine Arts, both in Vienna, Austria, where he graduated in 1988. Beck has been a visiting artist in the art and design programs at the California Institute of the Arts in Valencia, California (1999–2000); he has held a guest professorship in the CCCS program at the École Supérieure des Beaux-Arts, Geneva (2001–2005). Since 2004, he has worked as a professor at the Academy of Fine Arts Vienna where he teaches courses on exhibition and display issues as well as artistic and design methodology.

== Artistic practice ==
Beck’s artworks range from complex, mixed-media installations to subtle architectural interventions, and often explore the role of display in exhibition frameworks. He adapts many mediums and strategies in order to “...problematize the exhibition form, along with the social and aesthetic implications it wields on our perceptions.” His exhibitions investigate the boundaries between artworks, exhibit and support structure, as well as the relationship between art and social conditions or popular culture. Artist and critic Yuki Higashino writes in the Avery Review: “[Beck’s] true medium is exhibition making. It is the totality, the configuration of artifacts, the social context, the supplementary materials like a press release, and the architecture of the venue that together constitute the art exhibition and the work of art that Beck produces.” Frequently Beck’s projects and shows include artifacts or works by other artists, architects, designers, and historical objects. His practice elaborates and expands the conceptual tradition of redefining the role of the artist and of what constitutes an artistic practice.

== Bodies of work ==
His main bodies of works from the 2000s investigated how the modern conception of display developed in the mid-20th century. For his solo exhibition an Exhibit viewed played populated at Grazer Kunstverein, Beck presented works that emerged from his research on Richard Hamilton’s 1957 an Exhibit in which colored acrylic panels, suspended from the gallery ceiling, created an environment that turned the gallery space itself into an artwork. For Installation, his collaborative exhibition with Julie Ault at Vienna Secession, he reconstructed a modular exhibit system called Struc-Tube, designed by George Nelson in 1948. The system was presented both as a sculpture and a functional structure to display other works by Beck and Ault. Subsequently, he used the same tubular system as a protagonist for a video-work titled About the Relative Size of Things in the Universe (2007), first presented as part of his exhibition The details are not the details at the artist-run gallery Orchard in New York.

Between 2000 and 2010, Beck frequently designed exhibitions for art institutions, mostly in collaboration with Ault. These include over two dozen shows for the International Center of Photography in New York between 2001 and 2004; X-Screen: Film Installations and Actions of the 1960s and 1970s (2003) and Changing Channels: Art and Television 1963–1987 (2010) for Mumok – Museum Moderner Kunst Stiftung Ludwig, Vienna; Projekt Migration (2005) at Kölnischer Kunstverein, Cologne; Journeys: How Travelling Fruit, Ideas and Buildings Rearrange Our Environment (2010) at Canadian Centre for Architecture, Montreal, and Jim Hodges: Give More Than You Take (2014) at the Hammer Museum, Los Angeles. In 2011, in collaboration with architect Ken Saylor, Beck designed the gallery architecture of Ludlow 38 in New York.

In more recent years, Beck’s practice has expanded to address the cross-section of design, social history, and pop culture. For his project Panel 2—“Nothing better than a touch of ecology and catastrophe to unite the social classes...," he drew on the events of the 1970 International Design Conference in Aspen (IDCA) and the development of the Aspen Movie Map. The 1970 conference, themed “Environment by Design,” marked a turning point in design history wherein the vanguard of 1950s modernism such as George Nelson and Herbert Bayer confronted younger, hippie culture-influenced environmental activists and designers. Beck combined the narrative of this event with his research on the predecessor of today’s navigation systems, the Aspen Movie Map, and developed an exhibition consisting of videos, photography, prints, sculpture, and artifacts.

Beck’s interests have progressed to the formation and functioning of temporary communities. Through a series of loosely connected works, he has been exploring the history of American countercultural communes of the 1960s and early 1970s. His video Turn Take Merge uses GPS directions leading from Haight-Ashbury in San Francisco, the epicenter of 1960s hippie culture, to Drop City, a countercultural community established in southern Colorado in 1965 and abandoned by the early 1970s that became known as the first rural hippie commune. For the work titled rumors and murmurs (2012/17), Beck used an illustration from the 1968 Dome Cookbook by Steve Baer, a manual for dome building, to create a freestanding wall covered in fabric sewn together from irregular polygons.

Between 2012 and 2016, Beck worked on Last Night, a series of works centered around a sequence of records David Mancuso played on June 2, 1984 during one of the last dance parties of the Prince Street iteration of The Loft, an underground dance party begun by Mancuso in 1970. Beck researched all the records played that night and published their production information as an artist book in 2013 (a revised second edition was published in 2019). The culmination of his project was a thirteen-and-half hour video work, first presented as an installation at The Kitchen in New York (2017). The video shows each record played in its entirety on a vintage turntable.

Both projects explore the notion of community, however temporal, and the social and physical structures that are required for its formation. Art historian Branden W. Joseph wrote: “The question ‘Is there a form to shared togetherness?’ guided Beck’s investigation into both the communes of the 1960s... and the disco of the ’70s and early ’80s, two cultural poles most often perceived as in stark opposition to each other. (This dichotomy is similar to that between the counterculture of the ’60s and the management culture of the following decades, which Beck’s work also deconstructs.)”

In 2014, Beck was commissioned to develop a project to go along with the re-branding, initiated by then-director James Voorhies, of the Carpenter Center for the Visual Arts at Harvard University. The commission resulted in a two-year exhibition titled Program that consisted of ten episodic interventions, each addressing one of the institution’s channels of communication. The project culminated in the book An Organized System of Instructions.

Beck is represented by 47 Canal gallery in New York. His works are held in the collections of the Museum of Modern Art, New York; Schaulager, Basel; Museum Moderner Kunst Stiftung Ludwig Vienna; Hessel Museum of Art, Annandale-On-Hudson; and Frac Lorraine, Metz, France; among others.

== Exhibitions ==
Beck has held solo and collaborative exhibitions at Neue Gesellschaft für Bildende Kunst, Berlin (2000, with Julie Ault); Grazer Kunstverein, Graz (2003); Secession, Vienna (2006, with Julie Ault); Casco, Utrecht (2007); Gasworks, London (2008); Arthur Ross Architecture Gallery at Columbia University, New York (2009); Leonard & Bina Ellen Gallery, Montreal (2012); Kunsthaus Glarus, Switzerland (2013); Galerie für Zeitgenössische Kunst Leipzig (2017); The Kitchen, New York (2017); Bergen Kunsthall, Bergen, Norway (2018); Frac Lorraine, Metz, France (2018); and 47 Canal, New York (2012, 2015, and 2018). In 2017, Mumok – Museum Moderner Kunst Stiftung Ludwig Vienna, staged a mid-career survey of his work.

Group show participations include the 10th Shanghai Biennale (2014–15); The Whole Earth: California and the Disappearance of the Outside at Haus der Kulturen der Welt, Berlin (2013); the 29th São Paulo Bienal (2010, with Julie Ault); and the 4th Bucharest Biennale (2010).

In 2013, with Julie Ault, Nicola Dietrich, Heinz Peter Knes, Jason Simon, Danh Vō, and Scott Cameron Weaver, he co-curated Tell It To My Heart: Collected by Julie Ault for the Museum für Gegenwartskunst in Basel, Culturgest in Lisbon, and Artists Space in New York. Concurrent with his 2017 survey show at mumok – Museum Moderner Kunst Stiftung Ludwig Vienna – he curated watching sugar dissolve in a glass of water, an exhibition of works from the museum’s collection. In April 2020, together with Julie Ault, Scott Cameron Weaver, and James Benning, Beck co-curated and produced the online exhibition Down the Rabbit Hole: JB in JT for O-Townhouse.

== Artist books and monographs ==
- rumors and murmurs (Cologne: Verlag der Buchhandlung Walther König, 2017) ISBN 978-3960981374
- An Organized System of Instructions (Berlin: Sternberg Press, 2017) ISBN 978-3956792632
- Last Night (New York: White Columns, 2013; second revised edition 2019) ISBN 978-0964846876
- the particular way in which a thing exists (Montreal: Leonard & Bina Ellen Gallery at Concordia University, 2013) ISBN 978-2-920394-93-3
- The Aspen Complex (Berlin: Sternberg Press, 2012) ISBN 978-3-943365-07-8
- Installation, with Julie Ault (Cologne: Verlag der Buchhandlung Walther König, 2006 ISBN 978-3865601353
- an exhibit viewed played populated (Frankfurt: Revolver, 2005) ISBN 978-3865881748
- half modern, half something else (Charles Jencks, The Language of Post-Modern Architecture, first, second, third, fourth, fifth, sixth, and seventh editions) (Vienna: Montage, 2003)
- Critical Condition: Ausgewählte Texte im Dialog, with Julie Ault (Essen: Kokerei Zollverein, 2003) ISBN 978-3935783118
- Outdoor Systems, indoor distribution, with Julie Ault (Berlin: Neue Gesellschaft für bildende Kunst, 2000) ISBN 978-3926796691
