= WJS =

WJS may refer to:

- West Jesmond Metro station, Newcastle upon Tyne, Tyne and Wear Metro station code
- William James Society, an interdisciplinary professional society
- New Taipei City Wan Jin Shi Marathon, an annual gold label road race in New Taipei City, Taiwan
