= Mark von Schlegell =

American novelist

Mark von Schlegell (born 1967, New York) is an American science fiction writer and cultural critic. He lives in Germany and the U.S. His novels include Venusia (2005), which was honors listed for the James Tiptree, Jr. Award, Mercury Station (2009) and Sundogz (2015).

He works regularly as an international art writer. Projects from recent years include writing The Lepidopters (2012–14), a comic book/rock opera originating in Yogyakarta, Indonesia, co-curating the exhibition Dystopia at the CAPC Bordeaux in 2011, and scripting the Ben Rivers film Slow Action (2010).

Since 2011, von Schlegell has taught at the Städelschule in Frankfurt am Main and launched a seminar titled Pure Fiction, which evolved into a hybrid writing, art, and performance collective.

His father was sculptor David von Schlegell and his mother is poet Susan Howe. His siblings include painter R. H. Quaytman.

== Writings ==
- Ickles, Ad Infinitum. New York: Inpatient Press, 2019.
- Ickles, Etc. Berlin: Sternberg Press, 2014. WorldCat OCLC 941537315.
- Dreaming the Mainstream: Tales of Yankee Power. Berlin: Merve, 2013. WorldCat OCLC 840728760.
- New Dystopia. Berlin: Sternberg Press. 2011 OCLC 759972525
- Mercury Station: a transit. Los Angeles: Semiotext(e). 2009. OCLC 288986122
- High wichita. [Kbh.]: KBH Kunsthal. 2006. OCLC 475063339
- Venusia: A True Story. New York: Semiotext(e), 2005. WorldCat OCLC 60560678.
- Realometer: Uncovering Discovery in American Literature. Ph.D. thesis, New York University, Graduate School of Arts and Science, 2000. WorldCat OCLC 713010443.
