= Linda Simon =

American academic (born 1946)

Linda Simon (born 12 December 1946) is professor emerita of English at Skidmore College.

== Early life ==
Simon was born in Brooklyn, New York, on 12 December 1946, and grew up in Flushing, New York. She is the oldest daughter of Samuel M. Perlin and Kay Perlin. She attended Queens College, New York, and holds a master's degree from New York University, and earned a PhD in English from Brandeis University, where her mentors included Milton Hindus and Michael T. Gilmore.

== Teaching ==
She taught in the Expository Writing Program at Harvard University, serving as director of the writing center before joining the English department at Skidmore College, where she was a professor and department chair. At Skidmore, she taught in two abroad programs in London and Paris, where she conducted research for a biography of Coco Chanel. Simon lives in Oakland, California. She is professor emerita of English at Skidmore College.

== Writing ==
A trip to Paris inspired Simon's first book, Gertrude Stein: A Composite Portrait (Avon, 1974), which then led to her writing a biography of Stein's companion Alice B. Toklas. Simon is drawn to biographical subjects who defied expectations in forging their identity and life path, including Toklas, the philosopher and psychologist William James, and fashion designer Coco Chanel. Genuine Reality: A Life of William James was selected as a New York Times Notable Book of 1997. Her research for a cultural history, Dark Light: Electricity and Anxiety from the Telegraph to the X-ray, was supported by a grant from the American Philosophical Society.

A past president of the William James Society, since 2006, she has served as general editor of the society's journal William James Studies, and has contributed introductions to volumes V and VI of The Correspondence of William James, edited by Ignas Skrupskelis and Elizabeth Berkeley.

== Selected publications ==
- The Biography of Alice B. Toklas (Doubleday, 1977; University of Nebraska Press, 1991)
- Thornton Wilder: His World (Doubleday, 1979)
- Genuine Reality: A Life of William James (Harcourt, 1998; University of Chicago Press, 1999)
- Dark Light: Electricity and Anxiety from the Telegraph to the X-Ray (Harcourt, 2004; Harvest, 2005)
- The Critical Reception of Henry James: Creating a Master (Camden House, 2007)
- Gertrude Stein Remembered (University of Nebraska Press, 1994) (Editor)
- William James Remembered (University of Nebraska Press, 1996)
- Coco Chanel 2011.
- The Greatest Shows on Earth: A History of the Circus. 2014.
- Lost Girls: The Invention of the Flapper. 2016.
