= Schönberg Family =

1907 painting by Richard Gerstl

- Familie Schönberg (German)
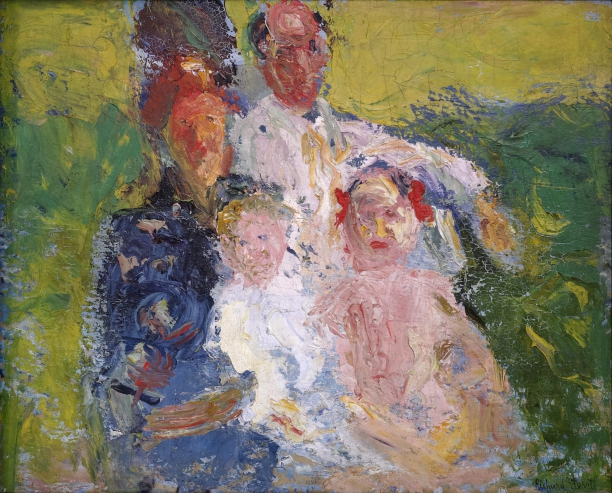
- Artist: Richard Gerstl
- Year: 1907
- Medium: oil on canvas
- Dimensions: 109.7 cm × 88.8 cm (43.2 in × 35.0 in)
- Location: mumok; Vienna

Schönberg Family is an oil on canvas painting by Austrian painter Richard Gerstl, from 1907.

== Description ==
The painting is an oil on canvas, with dimensions 109.7 x 88.8 centimeters. It is in the collection of the mumok, in Vienna.

== Analysis ==
Gerstl painted a group portrait of the Arnold Schoenberg family, and gave painting lessons.

== Sources ==
- Arts Magazine, Volume 58, Issues 6-10, Art Digest Incorporated, 1984
