= Untitled (L's) =

- Artist: David Von Schlegell
- Year: 1980
- Type: Steel
- Dimensions: 17 m × 0.30 m × 14 m (55 ft × 1 ft × 45 ft)
- Location: Indianapolis, Indiana, United States; 39°46.431′N 86°10.456′W
- Owner: Indiana University-Purdue University Indianapolis

Untitled (L's), a public sculpture by American artist David Von Schlegell, is located on the Indiana University-Purdue University Indianapolis campus, which is near downtown Indianapolis, Indiana. The sculpture is located just north of Joseph Taylor Hall in a grassy courtyard adjacent to Michigan Street. Cavanaugh hall frames the courtyard to the west, the library and Business building are east of the courtyard. This sculpture was created in 1978, and installed at IUPUI in 1980. The sculpture is a Minimalist composition of three identical steel L's. The L structures have a vertical beam that is 55 feet (17 m) tall and a horizontal beam of 45 feet (14 m). The beams themselves are 16 inches (410 mm) high and 12 inches (300 mm) wide.

== Description ==
The Untitled (L's) sculpture has three identical components and was fabricated by a yacht manufacturer in New York state. Each vertical beam measures 55 feet (17 m) tall and each horizontal beam is 45 feet (14 m) long. The beams themselves are 16 inches (410 mm) in height and 12 inches (300 mm) wide. Each component has a structural steel core with an 1/8-inch-thick (3.2 mm) layer of brushed stainless steel sheeting over the top.

The sculpture was installed in deep concrete beds, ensuring that it will not blow over due to a storm or heavy winds. The stainless surface had been finished such that the light reflecting of it makes the surface appear uneven and textural.

While the sculpture consists of three separate components, it functions as one, singular Minimalist sculpture.

== Information ==
The Untitled (L's) was realized as a result of a suggestion made by the former Secretary of IUPUI Faculty Council, Phillis Danielson. Von Schlegell's piece was selected from 100 submissions to be a permanent part of the IUPUI collection. A council of well-respected individuals in the art community selected the Untitled (L's). This committee included former Dean of the Herron School of Art, Arthur Weber, Former Curator of the Indianapolis Museum of Art, Diana Lazarus, and Edward Larrabee Barnes, the master architect for IUPUI at the time.

The Untitled (L's) sculpture was paid for by the National Endowment for the Arts under the "Works of Art for Public Spaces" program. The project cost $120,000 and five years to complete. The National Endowment for the Arts donated $50,000 to the project, the rest was paid for by private donations. The project was installed in 1980, and dedicated on October 7.

This sculpture is designed on the theme of the Pythagorean theorem. This theorem comes from geometry and states that square of the hypotenuse of a right triangle is equal to the sum of the squares of the other two sides. The three L structures are laid out so that the base point of the vertical columns form a large right triangle. The distance between the three points are 138 feet (42 m), 184 feet (56 m), and 230 feet (70 m). This gives the right triangle the classic 3:4:5 ratio. The school found this theme appropriate, seeing as it represented a tradition of math, logic, and wisdom at IUPUI.

The artist intended for landscaping to be a part of the sculpture as well. Before the installation of Von Schlegell's sculpture, the courtyard was two acres of concrete. Von Schlegell saw to it that grass was planted and that there be trees and bushes surrounding the courtyard. Originally, Von Schlegell had one path that stretched diagonal across the courtyard, dividing it into two traingluar shapes. This has since been modified to accommodate more walking paths. The landscaping was meant to contrast his piece, accentuating the natural and manmade elements within the space.

== Controversy ==
The Untitled (L's) sculpture was not very popular at the time of installation. Many students, including the student body president, mistakenly believed that the sculpture had been funded with the university's budget. In actuality, the funds came from the National Endowment for the Arts and private donations through the Indiana University Foundation. Other artists within the community criticized Von Schlegell, accusing him of compromising his vision as an artist. The critics believed that Von Schlegell's piece was not in fact about the Pythagorean theorem, logic, wisdom, or any other virtues of the university. Rather, they thought he forced that premise on the sculpture, believing it increased his chances at being chosen.

== Artist ==
David Von Schlegell (1920–1992) was born in St. Louis, Missouri. He studied at the University of Michigan in the 1940s, and then entered the Air Force. He made his return to art when he joined the Art Students League in New York. By the 1960s, Von Schlegell had established himself as a prominent sculptor. He worked mostly with aluminum, steel, and wood. The inspiration for his industrial materials came from his love of aircraft and boats. At the time of the installation of Untitled (L's), Von Schlegell was working as a faculty of the Yale School of Fine Arts.

In addition to sculpting, Von Schlegell also made paintings and drawings. After dedicating his Untitled (L's), he also had an exhibition in IUPUI's Lecture Hall and at the Herron School of Art displaying his photographs and drawings from the project.

He died on October 6, 1992, in New Haven, Connecticut, at the age of 72.

Other works from David Von Schlegell are located at the following locations:

- Storm King Art Center, New York
- Boston
- Miami Lakes, Florida
- Duluth, Minnesota
- Nasa Memorial to Robert Goddard at Clark University, Worcester, Massachusetts
- Saudi Arabian Royal Navy Headquarters
- Yeatmen's Cove Sculpture Project, Cincinnati
- Tulsa, Oklahoma International Airport
- San Francisco
- Hartford
- Marina Miami, Ohio
- Westward Cincinnati, Ohio
- Whitney Museum of Art
- Rhode Island School of Design
