= Rhea Anastas =

American art historian

Rhea Anastas (born March 11, 1969) is an American art historian, critic and curator who is an associate professor at the University of California, Irvine. She is one of the founding members of the artist-run gallery Orchard in New York City.

== Life ==
Anastas was born in Gloucester, Massachusetts. She received her B.A. and M.A. in Art History from Columbia University in 1990 and 1995 respectively, and her Ph.D. in Art History from the Graduate Center of the City University of New York in 2004. Her dissertation was titled The Whole Artist: Dan Graham and Robert Smithson, Works and Writings, 1965–69.

Anastas taught at the Art and Curatorial Practices in the Public Sphere program at the Roski School of Art and Design, University of Southern California, The Center for Curatorial Studies and Art in Contemporary Culture at Bard College, and was a lecturer at the Mason Gross School of the Arts at Rutgers University.

== Work ==
=== Books ===
- Anastas, Rhea; Ledare, Leigh (2015). Double Bind. A.R.T. Press.
- Anastas, Rhea (2012). Allan McCollum JRP-Ringier.
- Anastas, Rhea; Brenson, Michael (2006). Witness to Her Art: Art and Writings by Adrian Piper, Mona Hatoum, Cady Noland, Jenny Holzer, Kara Walker, Daniela Rossell and Eau de Cologne. Center for Curatorial Studies, Bard College.
- Anastas, Rhea; Brouwer, Marianne; Verlag, Richter (2001). Dan Graham: Works 1965-2000.

=== Curatorial projects ===
- New Cuts, K8 Hardy, January 10-March 20, 2015, University Art Galleries, University of California, Irvine.
- Art in Embassies Exhibition, Curator, with Barbara Piwowarska, U.S. Embassy Residence, Warsaw, Poland (for Ambassador Lee A. Feinstein), October 2010 through 2011. Artists exhibited: Jo Baer, Melvin Edwards, Louise Lawler, Zoe Leonard, Jadwiga Maziarska, Lorraine O’Grady, Włodzimierz Pawlak, R. H. Quaytman, Allan Sekula, Jack Whitten, Petra Wunderlich.
- Orchard, 2005–2008, co-founder, organizer of various exhibitions and programs.

=== Articles and essays ===
- Language is the social dress in Josephine Pryde, The Enjoyment of Photography. Zurich: JRP Ringier and Kunsthalle Bern, 2015.
- Models of the Feminist Everyday in Jennifer Bornstein. Berlin: Buchhandlung Walther König and Berliner Künstlerprogram der DAAD, 2015.
- The Artist Is a Currency Rhea Anastas, Gregg Bordowitz, Andrea Fraser, Jutta Koether, Glenn Ligon, in Reading/Feeling, eds. Tanja Baudoin, Frédérique Bergholtz and Vivian Ziherl. Amsterdam: If I Can't Dance, I Don't Want To Be Part Of Your Revolution, 2013. Reprint of 2006 roundtable for Grey Room no. 24 and Documenta 12.
- Individual and Unreal: Agnes Martin’s Writings in 1973 in Agnes Martin, eds. Lynne Cooke, Karen Kelly and Barbara Schröder. New Haven: Yale University Press and the Dia Art Foundation, New York, 2011, pages 132–152.
- Minimal Difference: The John Daniels Gallery and the First Works of Dan Graham in Dan Graham: Beyond, eds. Bennett Simpson and Chrissie Iles. Los Angeles: Museum of Contemporary Art; Cambridge, Mass.: The MIT Press, 2009, pages 110–126.
- ‘Not in eulogy not in praise but in fact': Ruth Vollmer and Others, 1966–70 in Nadja Rottner and Peter Weibel, eds. Ruth Vollmer 1961–1978 Thinking the Line. Ostfildern: Hatje Cantz, 2006, pages 71–85.
- The Reconstruction Process: Barry Le Va, 1968–1975 in Ingrid Schaffner, ed. Barry Le Va: Accumulated Vision. Philadelphia: The Institute of Contemporary Art, 2005, pages 36–53.
