= John J. McDermott (philosopher) =

American philosopher and professor (1932–2018)

- Born: John Joseph McDermott; January 5, 1932; New York City, U.S.
- Died: September 30, 2018 (aged 86); College Station, Texas, U.S.

Education
- Education: St. Francis College (BA); Fordham University (MA, PhD)
- Doctoral advisor: Robert Channon Pollock

Philosophical work
- Era: Contemporary philosophy
- Region: Western philosophy
- School: Pragmatism
- Institutions: Queens College, City University of New York; Texas A&M University
- Main interests: Philosophy of education, aesthetics

John Joseph McDermott (January 5, 1932 – September 30, 2018) was an American philosopher and a professor at Texas A&M University. He was a distinguished professor at Texas A&M since 1981 and held the Melbern G. Glasscock Chair in the Humanities.

== Biography ==
McDermott was born in Richmond Hill, Queens, New York City to John J. and Helen Kelly McDermott. He was the first of eight children in a lower-middle class family. He earned an undergraduate degree in 1953 at St. Francis College. He went to Fordham University to complete a master's degree and a Ph.D. in 1959 (with a thesis titled: "Experience is Pedagogical: the genesis and essence of the American nineteenth century notion of experience"). He completed a postdoctoral fellowship at Union Theological Graduate School. McDermott joined the faculty of Queens College, City University of New York, where he stayed until he took a position at Texas A&M University as philosophy professor and department head in 1977.

At Texas A&M, McDermott called the school's first faculty meeting in 1983. That meeting resulted in the formation of the school's faculty senate and McDermott was the group's first speaker. That year he won a Distinguished Achievement Award in Teaching from the university. He founded the College of Medicine's Humanities in Medicine Department, and he was the department head from 1983 to 1990. In 2012, McDermott was named the founding director of the school's Community of Faculty Retirees.

A focus of McDermott's work is the connection between American philosophy and culture. He compiled and introduced volumes of writing by William James, Josiah Royce and John Dewey. He was president of the Society for the Advancement of American Philosophy from 1978 to 1980 and of the William James Society in 2001-2002. In 2016, he was awarded the society's first Lifetime Achievement Award. He was named a Distinguished Fellow of the American Montessori Society in 1980.

McDermott died on September 30, 2018. He is survived by his second wife, Patricia, and five children from his first marriage. McDermott was very involved in Alcoholics Anonymous, and when he died he had been sober for 30 years.
