= Orchard (artist-run space) =

Coordinates: 40°42′59.5″N 73°59′28.5″W

Orchard was an artist-run exhibition and event space located at 47 Orchard Street in New York's Lower East Side from 2005-2008. The gallery was run as a for-profit limited liability corporation founded for the project. The partners included artists, filmmakers, critics, art historians, and curators. Orchard was among early contemporary art projects and galleries that moved onto Orchard and generally the Lower East Side below Delancey Street along with Miguel Abreu Gallery, Reena Spaulings, and Scorched Earth. Brandon Joseph noted, "the Orchard 'project' treaded a fine—and perhaps ultimately impossible—line between self-reflexivity and (to use a barbaric neologism) self-complicity, which could veer at times into self-promotion."

Orchard's program focused on, "thematically, conceptually and politically driven group exhibitions and projects," according to the space's website.

Orchard restaged or produced unrealized projects by Michael Asher, Andrea Fraser with Allan McCollum, Dan Graham, and Lawrence Weiner. Orchard has also presented historical works by Daniel Buren, Luis Camnitzer, Juan Downey, Hans Haacke, Roberto Jacoby, Adrian Piper, Anthony McCall and Martha Rosler, as well as new works by Martin Beck, Merlin Carpenter, Nicolás Guagnini, Jutta Koether, Josiah McElheny, Lucy McKenzie, Blake Rayne, Stephan Pascher, Jeff Preiss, R. H. Quaytman, Karin Schneider, and Jason Simon, among others.

== Partners ==
- Rhea Anastas
- Moyra Davey
- Andrea Fraser
- Nicolás Guagnini
- Gareth James
- Christian Philipp Müller
- Jeff Preiss
- R. H. Quaytman
- Karin Schneider
- Jason Simon
- John Yancy, Jr.
- Anonymous
