= R. H. Quaytman =

American contemporary artist (born 1961)

- Born: Rebecca Howe Quaytman; 1961 (age 64–65); Boston, Massachusetts
- Education: Bard College, Institut des Hautes Études en Arts Plastiques
- Notable work: Chapters 1-34
- Movement: Abstract art
- Awards: Rome Prize 1991
- Website: Abreu Gallery

R. H. Quaytman (born 1961) is an American contemporary artist, best known for paintings on wood panels, using abstract and photographic elements in site-specific "Chapters", now numbering 35. Each chapter is guided by architectural, historical and social characteristics of the original site. Since 2008, her work has been collected by a number of modern art museums. She is also an educator and author based in Connecticut.

== Early life and education ==
Rebecca Howe Quaytman was born in Boston, Massachusetts, in 1961. Her mother is the noted American postmodern poet Susan Howe, and her father was abstract painter Harvey Quaytman, well known for geometric works, with over 60 one-person exhibits. Her parents met while studying painting at the School of the Museum of Fine Arts, Boston. The family moved to the SoHo neighborhood of New York City in 1963.

When Quaytman was 4, her parents separated. Her mother began living with and decades later married David von Schlegell, an abstract artist and sculptor. He became the director of graduate studies in sculpture at Yale University.

Quaytman credits both her father and step-father with greatly influencing her development as an artist. Quaytman was an Artist in Residence at Skowhegan School of Painting and Sculpture in 1982, and received a BA from Bard College in 1983.

Her half-brother is writer Mark von Schlegell.

== Career ==
In 1987 she was hired by PS1, later becoming Program Coordinator for three years. While there, she organized the first US solo exhibition dedicated to pioneering Swedish abstract painter Hilma af Klint, in 1989. She later worked as an assistant to artist Dan Graham. In 1991, she was awarded the Rome Prize allowing a full year of dedicated work. Additionally she studied for one year at the National College of Art & Design in Dublin, Ireland, and later the attended Institut des Hautes Études en Arts Plastiques in Paris to study with Daniel Buren and Pontus Hultén.

In 2005, Quaytman was a founding member and the Director of a cooperative gallery in Manhattan's Lower East Side called Orchard, run by twelve partners, including artists, filmmakers, art historians and curators. Since 2006 she has been on the faculty of Bard College, in Annandale-on-Hudson, New York, teaching painting in the Masters of Fine Arts program, and is frequently a visiting artist, scholar or lecturer at other colleges and museums.

After winning the 1992 Rome Prize, in that year of uninterrupted time to pursue artistic development, Quaytman began to make a series of paintings which belonged together, which she described as "sentences." She cites her epiphany as "The stance of the painting is the profile", after which she thought of her paintings in the context of the audience walking by, grouped together and observed with peripheral vision.

After working as an assistant to Dan Graham, who had been experimenting with time-delay video installations, she began to use photographic images in her work, which she applies with silkscreening. A silkscreen of Graham himself would later be featured in her work. She found the use of silkscreening to be liberating, and cites influence from Rauschenberg, Warhol, Polke and Richter.

In 2001, she was invited to participate in a show at the Queens Museum of Art, for which she made 40 paintings, in recognition of her 40th birthday, plus another 40 for a local gallery. The 80 paintings were all linked conceptually, and formed the first "chapter": "The Sun, Chapter 1". In the exhibit, she references the death of her grandfather and great-grandfather, by train crash near the location in Queens, building on an article clipped from the New York newspaper The Sun.

Each subsequent chapter reflects and adapts elements of the venue in which they are initially shown. For "Lodz Poem, Chapter 2", at the Lodz Poland Biennial, she focused on two early Polish modernists, Katarzyna Kobro and Wladyslaw Strzeminski, interweaving caption paintings and drawings from the World War II-era artists.

In 2008, she was selected for a solo show at the Miguel Abreu Gallery in New York, and a two-person show with artist Josef Strau, at Vilma Gold in London, for which she created "iamb, Chapter 12". This collection related to the use of light by Strau (actual lamps), and illustration, based on an image from Milton's Paradise Lost, illustrated by John Martin, a 19th-century English artist. The show was well received by critics, including Frieze Magazine and The Brooklyn Rail, noting "Quaytman makes reference in the title to both the seat of seeing (i am), and the classical meter of poetry", and "Quaytman's sophisticated dissection of the complexities of seeing and the manifold aspects that inform perception is evident not only in individual works, but also in the relationship between specific works installed in the exhibition, and in the cumulative effect of the whole," and The New York Times "The paintings in R. H. Quaytman's exhibition are cerebral, physically thought out and resolutely optical. They engage painting on every level in a restrained way; they also engage one another."

Distracting Distance, Chapter 16

She starred in Rosa von Praunheim's documentary New York Memories (2010). Quaytman was selected for the 2010 Whitney Biennial. She was offered a north-facing room featuring a trapezoidal window designed by Marcel Breuer. For the show, she created "Distracting Distance, Chapter 16", which reflects on the shape of the window and its reference to perspective, as well as on a famous painting in the Whitney – "A Woman in the Sun", by Edward Hopper, painted in 1961, the year of her birth. Photos of the entire room were published by Contemporary Art Daily.

Later in 2010, for the Neuberger Museum of Art in Purchase, New York, she created a retrospective exhibition "Spine, Chapter 20", of new pieces. Unlike all previous Chapters, this exhibit did not incorporate the specifics of the venue, instead reflecting upon all of her work to date. Together the Chapters form a figurative book – an overarching structure for all the paintings. "The installation itself has a 'spine': an 80-foot wall extending from one corner of the room, on which most of the roughly 30 paintings are hung, creating a sense of space – even emptiness, if you turn your attention toward the walls where paintings are customarily hung in the Neuberger." according to The New York Times critic Martha Schwendener. Pieces in this chapter pull elements from all her previous chapters, such as "Distracting Distance / Hardy", in which a nude woman stands in front of the Marcel Breuer window at the Whitney. "Spine, Chapter 20" also provided the final chapter of an impressive physical book – the retrospective she published in 2011, Spine, with 380 color illustrations.

In 2011, her painting was on the cover of Artforum magazine, with an essay by Paul Galvez describing her international "triumvirate of installations" in the past three years.

In 2017, her work was included in the Athens component of documenta 14.

Detail from Morning, Chapter 30 (2016) at Glenstone in 2022

Her first major museum survey, Morning, Chapter 30, was organized by the Museum of Contemporary Art, Los Angeles, (MOCA) in 2016.

In 2018, she created + x, Chapter 34, a body of work derived from the notebooks of Hilma af Klint and presented alongside the Guggenheim's major retrospective of that artist.

Her work is in numerous museum collections, including the Whitney, MoMA, The Guggenheim Museum, SFMOMA, and Tate Modern

R. H. Quaytman is represented by Miguel Abreu Gallery, and Gladstone Gallery.

== Selected publications ==
- Allegorical decoys (2008) Published by MER Paper Kunsthalle, on the occasion of the exhibition "From One O to the Other" at Orchard, NY, 47 pp, 2008. ISBN 978-90-769-7954-0
- Spine (2011) Published by Sternberg Press, Kunsthalle Basel and Sequence, 15.24 x 24.45 cm, 416 pp, 380 color ill., hardcover with dust jacket
- Dalet (ך), Chapter 24 (2012) Published by Museum Abteiberg Mönchengladbach, 21 x 16.5 x 2.5 cm, boxed set of 61 color cards
- Morning: Chapter 30 (2016) Published by The Museum of Contemporary Art, Los Angeles.

== Exhibitions ==
- Spencer Brownstone Gallery, New York (1998)
- China Art Objects Galleries, Los Angeles, CA Revolution, A Gallery Project, Ferndale, MI (1999)
- Optima, Chapter 3, Momenta Art, Brooklyn (2004)
- Lodz Biennial, Lodz, Poland (2004)
- The Sun, Chapter 1, Spencer Brownstone Gallery, New York (2004)
- Galerie Edward Mitterrand, Geneva, Switzerland (2004)
- iamb, Chapter 12, Vilma Gold Gallery, London (2008)
- imb, Chapter 12, Miguel Abreu Gallery, New York (2008)
- Momentum 15: Exhibition Guide, Chapter 15, The Institute of Contemporary Art, Boston (2009)
- Constructivismes, curated by Olivier Renaud-Clément, Almine Rech Gallery, Brussels (2009)
- New Work: R. H. Quaytman (2010), San Francisco Museum of Modern Art
- Whitney Biennial, Whitney Museum of American Art, New York (2010)
- The Renaissance Society Gallery, at The University of Chicago – Passing Through The Opposite of What It Approaches, Chapter 25 – Exhibition Page at Renaissance Society
- Morning Chapter 30 at MOCA DTLA
- Participation at Jay DeFeo : The Ripple Effect, Le Consortium, France, Dijon, 3 Feb - 20 May 2018
- R.H. Quaytman: + x, Chapter 34, Solomon R. Guggenheim Museum in New York, USA. October 12, 2018 - January 27, 2019
