= David von Schlegell =

American sculptor

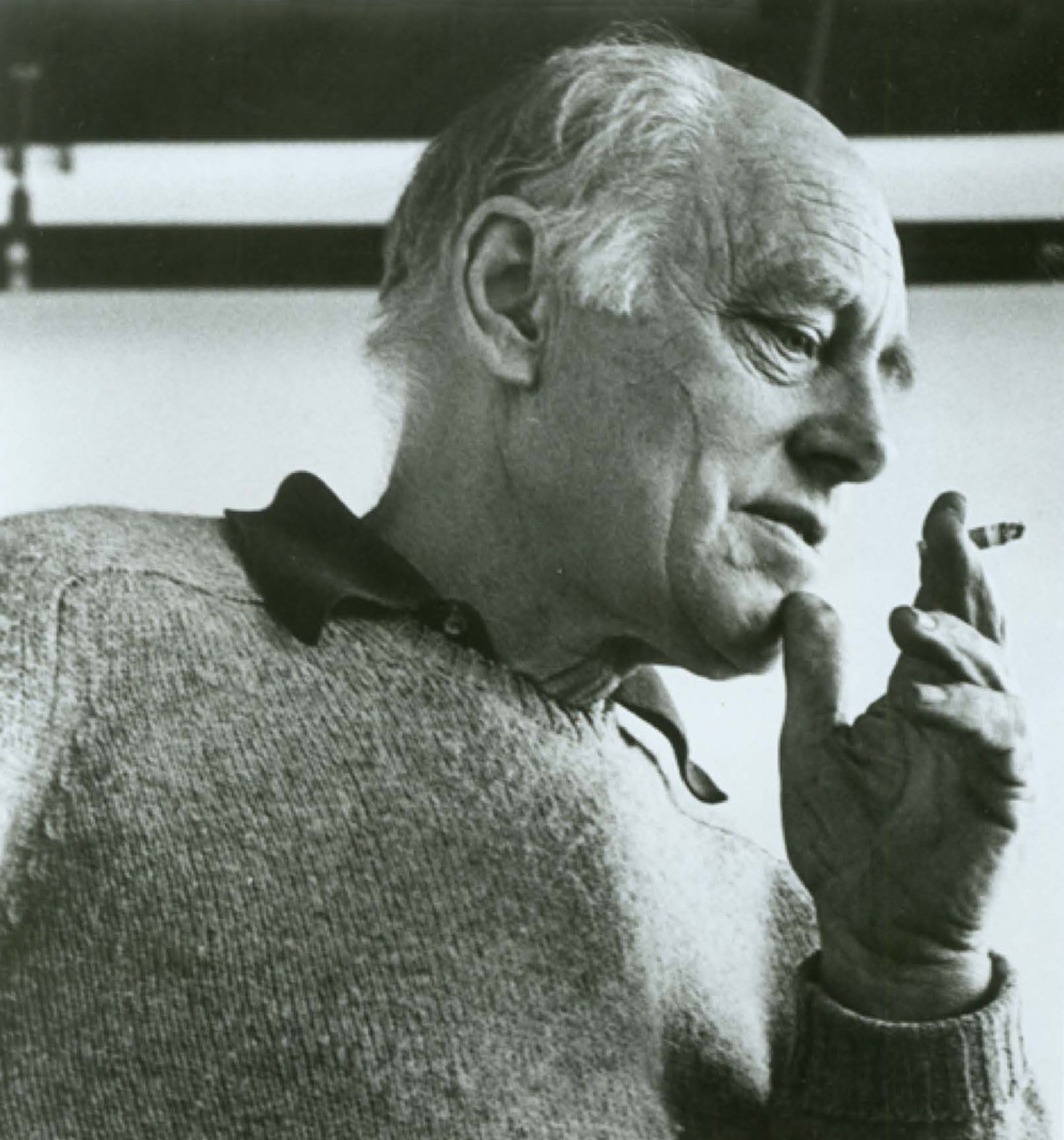
- Born: David von Schlegell; May 25, 1920; St. Louis, Missouri, U.S.
- Died: October 5, 1992 (aged 72); New Haven, Connecticut, U.S.
- Education: Art Students League of New York; University of Michigan
- Known for: Sculpture, painter
- Movement: Constructivism, minimalism
- Spouses: Mary W. Keep, Susan Howe
- Children: Lisa, Julia, Rosemary, Anthony and Mark von Schlegell

David Von Schlegell (May 25, 1920 – October 5, 1992) was an American abstract artist, sculptor and educator.

== Early life and education ==
David von Schlegell was born in St. Louis, Missouri in 1920, the son of American impressionist artist William von Schlegell and painter Alice "Bae" Anderson. At the University of Michigan in the early 1940s, his concentration was on naval and aviation engineering. During WWII, he served in the United States Army Air Forces from 1943 to 1944, becoming a first lieutenant. He was wounded on a mission over the Mediterranean, but managed to fly his badly damaged B-17 bomber and its crew to safety. For his bravery he was awarded a Purple Heart.

After the war, he joined the Art Students League of New York where his father taught, and continued to study painting with him in the artist's community of Ogunquit, Maine.

== Career ==
He showed his paintings regionally in the 1950s. In the early 1960s David von Schlegell built his own home and studio in Cape Neddick, Maine. During that time, he turned to making sculpture, soon establishing himself as an eminent sculptor showing in Boston. He moved from wood to large-scale works of polished steel and aluminum. He developed streamlined abstract forms and planes, often held in place by rigging wire, drawing from Constructivism and his lifelong interest in naval and airplane design.

He had his first one-man show of sculpture in New York City at the Royal Marks Gallery in 1965. He relocated to New York City the following year. In 1966, his work was presented in Kynaston McShine’s survey of 1960’s sculpture, "Primary Structures" at the Jewish Museum, an exhibition that helped establish Minimalism. This was followed by the Whitney Biennial, where his Radio Controlled Sculpture was exhibited.

He showed with Reese Palley Gallery in New York, and then with the "Park Place Group" of sculptors, including Mark di Suvero, Ronald Bladen, and Robert Grosvenor in 1968. His work was included in Carnegie International and other large-scale exhibitions.

von Schlegell began to design and build his first large-scale outdoor sculpture for the Storm King Art Center in 1969–1970. Other large-scale public sculpture followed: Untitled Landscape 1972 in I. M. Pei 's India Wharf Project in Boston.

In 1971 von Schlegell was appointed head of the Yale School of Art, Sculpture Department, which he ran for two decades. His students of note include Don Gummer, Roni Horn, Jessica Stockholder, Ann Hamilton, Matthew Barney, Sean Landers, and Katsuhisa Sakai.

He joined the roster of New York's Pace Gallery in the 1970s, showing handmade wood sculpture in New York through the 1970s and 80s. In the early 1990s, facing cancer, he returned to painting, creating a final series of monochromes. He died on October 5, 1992, in New Haven, Connecticut, at the age of 72.

In 2012 the David von Schlegell retrospective at the China Art Objects Gallery in Los Angeles, included Five Birds from 1988. The retrospective was curated by Mark von Schlegell, R.H.Quaytman, and Susan Howe.

== Personal life ==
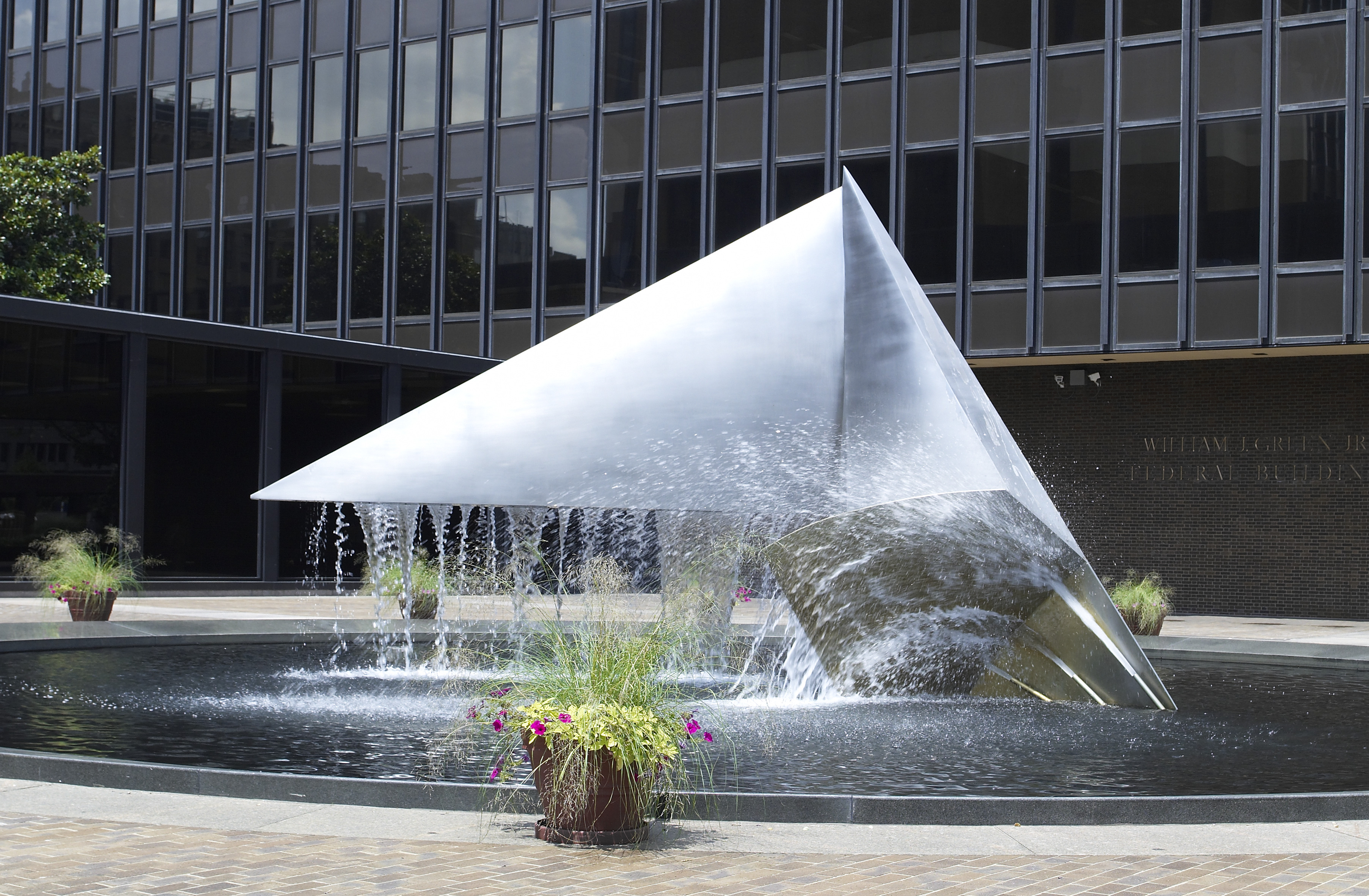
Voyage of Ulysses (1977), James A. Byrne United States Courthouse in Philadelphia, Pennsylvania

Untitled (1966), at Laumeier Sculpture Park in St. Louis, Missouri

In 1953 von Schlegell married Mary W. Keep in Ogunquit, Maine. They had four children, Lisa, Julia, Rosemary, and Anthony. In 1966, he and Keep separated and he moved to New York City.

In 1967, von Schlegell and poet Susan Howe had a child, Mark von Schlegell. He became a writer. Howe and von Sclegell married in 1986. His step-daughter is R H Quaytman.

== Art ==
=== Sculptures ===
Inspired by his wartime experience as an aircraft engineer, he worked mostly with aluminum, steel, and wood. His indoor work was featured at many important exhibitions of the 1960s, and by the 70s he was a prominent public sculptor. His large scale works can be found in cities across America, including Untitled (L's) on IUPUI's campus.

=== Painting and drawings ===
In addition to sculpting, Von Schlegell also made paintings and drawings. After dedicating his Untitled (L's), he also had an exhibition in IUPUI's Lecture Hall and at the Herron School of Art displaying his photographs and drawings from the project.

== Public works ==
- West End, located in the Governor Nelson A. Rockefeller Empire State Plaza Art Collection, Albany, NY, 1966
- Untitled, Storm King Art Center, 1969-1970
- Untitled Landscape, I. M. Pei 's India Wharf Project, Boston, 1972
- Marina, a polished metal sculpture currently on long-term loan from Miami-Dade Art in Public Places from the J. Patrick Lannan Foundation.
- Voyage of Ulysses, Byrne-Greene Courthouse, Philadelphia, 1977
- Southern High School, Baltimore. 1977
- Purdue University, Indianapolis, 1978
- Godard Memorial, Clark University, Worcester, MA, 1979
- Untitled (L's) A site-specific installation on the campus of IUPUI, 1980
- Untitled Landscape, located in Boston, Massachusetts at India Wharf on the Boston waterfront.
- Westward, Sawyer Point, Cincinnati, 1980
- Northern Light, Hartwood Acres, Pittsburgh, 1982
- Pilot's Memorial, Tulsa International Airport, Tulsa, 1984
- Fountain, Capitol Mall, Sacramento, 1985
- Eagle, Capitol Office Building, Hartford, 1989
- Ascending Birds, New Haven City Hall, 1989
- The Gate, Thompson Hill Visitor Center, Duluth, MN, 1976

== See also ==
A David von Schlegell Timeline
