= William James Society =

Learned society

The William James Society (WJS) is an interdisciplinary professional society which supports the study of the life and work of American psychologist and philosopher William James. The organization was founded in 1999. For several years, the WJS published a newsletter named Streams of William James. Since 2006, the society has published the peer reviewed academic online journal William James Studies.

== Current and past presidents ==
- [Phil Oliver]] (2025-2026)
- [See wjsociety.org]
- D. Micah Hester (2011–2012)
- Paul Croce (2009–2010)
- David Lamberth (2008)
- John Lachs (2007)
- Peter H. Hare (2006)
- William Gavin (2005)
- Charlene Haddock Seigfried (2004)
- Linda Simon (2003)
- John J. McDermott (2002)
