= Susan Howe =

American poet (born 1937)

- Susan Howe, 2026
- Born: June 10, 1937 (age 89); Boston, Massachusetts, U.S.
- Education: Boston Museum School of Fine Arts (1961)
- Occupations: Poet, scholar
- Spouse(s): Harvey Quaytman, David von Schlegell, Peter Hewitt Hare
- Writing career
- Genres: Poetry, essay
- Notable awards: Bollingen Prize in American Poetry (2011); Guggenheim Fellowship; Roy Harvey Pearce Prize for Lifetime Achievement; Robert Frost Medal, Poetry Society of America (2017)
- Movement: Postmodern

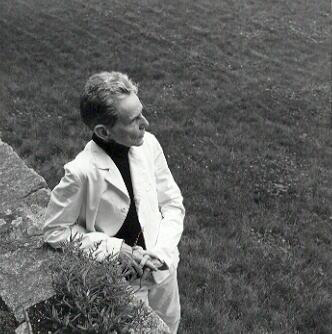
Susan Howe, c. 2007

Susan Howe (born June 10, 1937) is an American poet, scholar, essayist, and critic, who has been closely associated with postmodern and experimental movements in poetry. Her work expands traditional notions of genre (fiction, essay, prose and poetry) through hybrids that blend genres and incorporate others, such as documentary, archival research, and visual/verbal collage, and is often associated (even if distinct from) L=A=N=G=U=A=G=E. Howe's work has been translated into French, Spanish, Turkish, Swedish, Russian, Chinese, Italian, and many other languages.

Howe received the 2018 International Griffin Poetry Prize, the 2017 Robert Frost Medal awarded by the Poetry Society of America, and the 2011 Bollingen Prize in American Poetry (the most prestigious American award for lifetime achivement). She is a member of the American Academy of Arts and Sciences.

== Personal life ==
Howe was born in Boston, Massachusetts and grew up in nearby Cambridge. Her mother, Mary Manning, was an Irish playwright, novelist, film critic and screenwriter and acted for Dublin's Gate Theatre. Her father, Mark De Wolfe Howe, was a professor at Harvard Law School and the official biographer of Supreme Court Justice Oliver Wendell Holmes. He enlisted in the army after Pearl Harbor and, as a colonel, was posted overseas during WWII. At this time, the family moved to Cambridge, where Manning worked as a director for Radcliffe College's theater program. Howe has two sisters, the poet and novelist Fanny Howe and Helen Howe.

Howe worked as an apprentice at the Gate Theatre in Dublin after graduating from high school and continued to return to Ireland for many years during the summer to paint landscapes. She graduated from the Boston Museum School of Fine Arts in 1961. That same year, she married the painter Harvey Quaytman; their daughter, R.H. Quaytman, is also a noted painter.

Howe began her creative career in the visual arts, as a painter and installation artist based in New York City. Her work was influenced by conceptual and performance artists working in New York City during the 1960s. Gradually her work moved from paintings to installations. Inspired by concrete poetry and the work of John Cage, Charles Olson, and Ian Hamilton Finlay, she began making books and then drawings with words. In 1971, she stopped painting and began to write poetry.

Howe married a second time, to the sculptor David von Schlegell; their son, Mark von Schlegell, is a noted writer living in Cologne, Germany. They moved to Connecticut when von Schlegell was named director of the Sculpture Department at the Yale School of Art. David von Schlegell died in 1992, and in 2000, Howe married the philosopher and University of Buffalo professor Peter Hewitt Hare. He died in January 2008.

== Work & Career ==
Howe’s work has shown a life-long commitment to formal invention, on the one hand, and to historical exploration on the other. Her first poetry collection, Hinge Picture, published by Maureen Owen’s Telephone Books in 1974, circulated widely and paved the way for two books that made a strong mark on the experimental poetry world of the 1980s and 1990s. My Emily Dickinson, which came out in 1985, constitutes a new take on biography and literary criticism, and her 1993 text The Birth-Mark: Unsettling the Wilderness in American Literary History enlarges her engagement with writers from early New England, including less canonical figures, such as Anne Hutchinson and Mary Rowlandson, and examines the ways that biases regarding gender and class shaped the American literary canon.

She began publishing with New Directions with her 1993 volume The Nonconformist’s Memorial, in which she further expanded these themes. In subsequent volumes, she deepened her interest in the archive, in marginalia, and in other physical aspects of literary production. In many of her books, slivers of found texts are collaged to create evocative compositions. Her most recent collection, Penitential Cries, continues her conversation with 18^{th} through 20^{th} century American writers as well as her visual art practice of verbal collage. Her long-standing commitment to Emily Dickinson also includes her extensive introduction to The Gorgeous Nothings, a full-color facsimile of Dickinson’s “envelope poems.”

From 1975-1980, Howe was a producer of poetry programming at WBAI Pacifica Radio, 99.5 FM, in New York City, where she produced, edited, and hosted a total of 58 radio programs. These included poets reading from their work, interviews, and documentaries. The programs were partially funded by the National Endowment for the Arts: Media and Literature Departments. Several of these recordings are available online via the PennSound archive.

Though she never received formal academic training, Howe has taught at a number of universities; she held visiting positions at Temple University, the University of Denver, Stanford University, the University of Utah, and Princeton University. She was also a visiting professor at the State University of New York in 1988. She became a full professor at SUNY Buffalo in 1991, cofounding the Buffalo Poetics Program and in 2004 was named the Capen Chair of Poetry. She retired in 2007.

== Research Poetics ==
Susan Howe is one of the founders of a contemporary branch of poetics known as research-based poetry. Her own work has a particular focus on archives. Over the years she has spent considerable time at the archives of Yale’s Sterling and Beinecke libraries, as well as various other archives, researching the works and lives of her principal influences. H.D. was particularly important in this respect, and Howe did exhaustive work on her papers in the Beinecke. Other prominent research subjects include Jonathan and Sarah Edwards and their family papers, Cotton Mather, Emily Dickinson, Ralph Waldo Emerson, Charles Sanders Peirce, Robert Duncan, Charles Ives, and others. Much of her research is also engaged with early New England, its landscape—quarries and geology—and religious history.

== Reception ==
Since she began publishing, Howe’s work has consistently received critical praise. The poet John Ashbery has written, "Susan Howe taps a stream of American thinking that is as clear and fresh as a draught of well water. She is our conscience, our voice, our song." Of her 1999 volume Pierce-Arrow, on the life and work of the philosopher Charles Sanders Peirce, Allen Grossman has said, “Susan Howe’s Pierce-Arrow is a true and living poem—more philosophical than history, without ceasing to be history… it carries the heart elsewhere—beyond destination.”^{[1]} Of her 2003 volume, The Midnight, touching on family history and its ghosts, the Kirkus Review said: “The verse has an incantatory power that shines through…. giving a surreal, dreamlike atmosphere reminiscent of Borges at his sharpest.” She has received similar praise for all of her other works; of her recent, Concordance (2020), Hyperalergic said, “One of the many wonders of Concordance … is the pitch to which Howe has brought her own marriage of words and shapes…” and her most recent collection, Penitential Cries (2025) was praised in the Boston Review, which said, “For nearly thirty years, Howe has occupied a particular and invaluable place in American poetry… a writer whose demystifying intelligence is matched by a passionate embrace of poetry’s rejuvenating power.”

Howe's work has been widely anthologized, first in volumes associated with the Language Poetry movement, including the L=A=N=G=U=A=G=E poetry anthology, then In the American Tree, and later in prominent national anthologies, including The Norton Anthology of Modern and Contemporary Poetry, American Hybrid, and The Norton Anthology of Postmodern Poetry.

Her work has also been the subject of many critical articles, book chapters, books, and Ph.D. dissertations; book-length works include Led By Language: The Poetry and Poetics of Susan Howe by Rachel Tzvia Back and Stephen Collis's Through Words of Others: Susan Howe and Anarcho-Scholasticism. A complete list appears below.

== Awards & Honors ==
Susan Howe was awarded with the American Book Award, organized by the Before Columbus Foundation, in both 1981 and 1986. She was elected a member of the American Academy of Arts and Sciences in 1999 and a Chancellor of The Academy of American Poets in 2000. Howe also received an honorary doctorate from the National University of Ireland in Dublin. She is the first American poet to receive this honor. She was the fall 2009 Anna-Maria Kellen Fellow at the American Academy in Berlin, and was the Artist-in-Residence at the Isabella Stewart Gardner Museum in 2012. Her other honors include Yale University’s Bollingen Prize in American Poetry in 2011, a 1996 Guggenheim Fellowship, and the 2018 International Griffin Poetry Prize.

== Collaboration ==
Collaborating with musicians, visual artists, performance artists, and others has been central to Howe’s work for the past twenty-five years. In 2003, she started collaborating with the experimental musician David Grubbs. Together they created five records: Thiefth (featuring the poems Thorow and Melville's Marginalia), Songs of the Labadie Tract, Frolic Architecture, Woodslippercounterclatter, and Concordance. In 1976, she collaborated with Joan Jonas on her production The Juniper Tree, performed at the Philadelphia Institute of Contemporary Art. She has also worked with the letterpress artist Leslie Miller,^{[1]} Erica Van Horn and Simon Cutts of Coracle Press, the photo-artist James Welling,^{[2]} and others. In 2014, she collaborated with her daughter R.H. Quaytman and Leslie Miller on a limited edition artists book Tom Tit Tot, published by MoMA.

== Books ==
Poetry collections

- The Europe of Trusts (1990, Sun and Moon, 2002, New Directions) ISBN 978-0-8112-1507-7
- Singularities (1990, Wesleyan University Press) ISBN 978-0-8195-1194-2
- The Nonconformist’s Memorial (1993, New Directions) ISBN 978-0-8112-1229-8
- Frame Structures: Early Poems 1974-1979 (1996, New Directions) ISBN 978-0-8112-1322-6
- Pierce-Arrow (1999, New Directions) ISBN 978-0-8112-1410-0
- The Midnight (2003, New Directions) ISBN 978-0-8112-1538-1
- Souls of the Labadie Tract (2007, New Directions) ISBN 978-0-8112-1718-7
- That This (2010, New Directions) ISBN 978-0-8112-1918-1
- Debths (2017, New Directions) ISBN 978-0-8112-2685-1 Winner of the Griffin Poetry Prize
- Concordance (2020, New Directions) ISBN 978-0-8112-2959-3
- Penitential Cries (2025, New Directions) ISBN 978-0-8112-3982-0

Essays and criticism

- My Emily Dickinson (1985, North Atlantic Books; 2007, New Directions) ISBN 978-0-8112-1683-8
- The Birth-mark: Unsettling the Wilderness in American Literary History (1993, Wesleyan University Press) ISBN 978-0-8195-6263-0
- Introduction to 'The Gorgeous Nothings: Emily Dickinson's Envelope Poems' (2013, New Directions) ISBN 978-0-8112-1322-6
- Spontaneous Particulars: The Telepathy of Archives (2014, New Directions) ISBN 978-0-8112-2977-7
- The Quarry: Essays (2015, New Directions) ISBN 978-0-8112-2246-4

Chapbooks, pamphlets and artist's books

- Hinge Picture (1974, Telephone Books)
- Chanting at the Crystal Sea (1975, Fire Exit)
- The Western Borders (1976, Tuumba Press)
- Secret History of the Dividing Line (1978, Telephone Books)
- Cabbage Gardens (1979, Fathom Press)
- The Liberties (1980, Loon Books)
- Pythagorean Silence (1982, Montemora)
- Defenestration of Prague (1983, The Kulchur Foundation)
- Incloser (1985, The Weaselsleeves Press)
- Heliopathy (1986, Pushcart)
- Articulation of Sound Forms in Time (1987, Awede)
- A Bibliography of the King's Book or, Eikon Basilike (1989, Paradigm Press)
- The Nonconformist's Memorial (1992, The Grenfell Press)
- Silence Wages Stories (1992, Paradigm Press)
- Bed Hangings I (2001, Granary Books)
- Bed Hangings II (2002, Coracle Books)
- Kidnapped (2002, Coracle Books)
- Poems from a Pioneer Museum (2009, Coracle Books)
- Frolic Architecture (2010, The Grenfell Press)
- Sorting Facts, or Nineteen Ways of Looking at Marker (2013, New Directions)
- Tom Tit Tot (2014, The Grenfell Press)
- Concordance (2019, The Grenfell Press)

== Exhibitions ==
- The Palace of Concrete Poetry, Writers' House of Georgia, Tbilisi, 2022
- Drum Listens to Heart: Part II & III, The Wattis Institute, San Francisco, CA, 2022
- Caspar, Sgomento Zurigo, Zürich, 2020
- Acoustic Holographic Language, Bureau des Réalités, Brussels, 2018
- Whitney Biennial, New York City, curated by Stuart Comer, Anthony Elms, and Michelle Grabner, 2014
- Tom Tit Tot, Yale Union, 2013.
- The Artist’s Institute, New York, 2012
