= Peter Hewitt Hare =

American philosopher and professor (1925–2008)

- Born: March 12, 1935; New York City, US
- Died: January 3, 2008 (aged 72); Guilford, Connecticut, US
- Occupations: Philosopher, professor
- Spouse: Susan Howe
- Relatives: Elsie Clews Parsons (great aunt)

Academic background
- Education: Columbia University (PhD)

Academic work
- Era: Contemporary philosophy
- Institutions: University at Buffalo

Peter Hewitt Hare (March 12, 1935 — January 3, 2008) was an American philosopher and professor. He was Distinguished Service Professor Emeritus at the University at Buffalo.

== Early life and education ==
Hare was born on March 12, 1935, in New York City, one of at least three children born to Michael Meredith Hare and Jane (née Perry) Hare. His great aunt was anthropologist Elsie Clews Parsons, who he late wrote about.

Hare graduated from the Groton School. In 1957, he graduated from Yale University, later earning a Doctor of Philosophy from Columbia University. He wrote his dissertation on the metaphysics of George Herbert Mead.

== Career ==
In 1962 or 1965, Hare was hired to the University at Buffalo. In 1971, he was appointed acting chairman of the philosophy department, later becoming chairman proper. He served as such until 1975, again serving as chairman from 1985 to 1994. He wrote over 100 scholarly articles. On October 11, 1999, he gifted the university $1,000,000 – $500,000 upfront and another $500,000 in a bequest – to better fund the philosophy department. He retired in 2000, as an emeritus.

From the early 1970s, Hare was coeditor of the publications of the Charles S. Peirce Society, which he was a member of. He was also a member of the New York State Philosophy Association (serving as its president for a time) and the William James Society, among other organizations. He wrote the essay The Sopranos and Philosophy, his interpretation of the show being cyndicated widely after its conclusion aired.

Hare studied contemporary philosophy. He is known for his works addressing the problem of evil. Hare and Edward H. Madden's book Evil and the Concept of God (1968) is regarded as highly influential in the literature of problem of evil and has been cited by both critics and supporters.

== Personal life and death ==
On May 30, 1959, Hare married professor Daphne Joan Kean, who died in 1995. He had two children. He later married poet Susan Howe. In 2000, he moved to Guilford, Connecticut, dying there on January 3, 2008, aged 72.

== Selected publications ==
- Hare, Peter H; Madden, Edward H (1966). Evil and Unlimited Power. The Review of Metaphysics 20 (2): 278–289.
- Hare, Peter H; Madden, Edward H (1968). Evil and the Concept of God. Charles C. Thomas.
- Hare, Peter H; Madden, Edward H (1972). Evil and Inconclusiveness Sophia 11 (1): 8–12.
- Hare, Peter H; Madden, Edward H (1972). Evil and Persuasive Power. Process Studies 2 (1): 44–48.
