= Mumok =

Museum in Vienna, Austria

Coordinates: 48°12′13.4″N 16°21′26.8″E

Mumok Museum moderner Kunst Stiftung Ludwig Wien
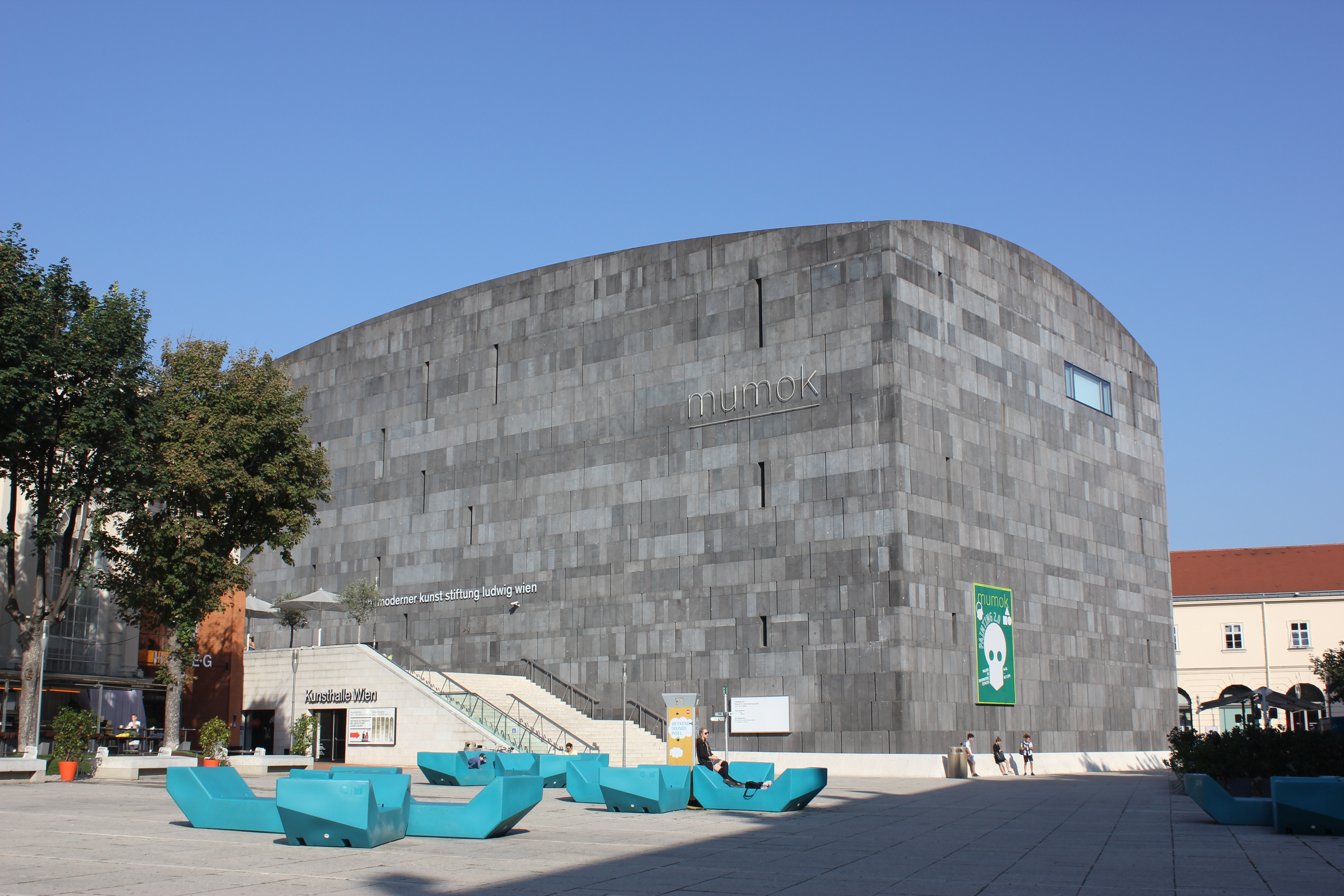
- Established: 15 September 2001
- Location: Museumsplatz 1, 1070 Vienna, Vienna, Austria
- Website: mumok.at

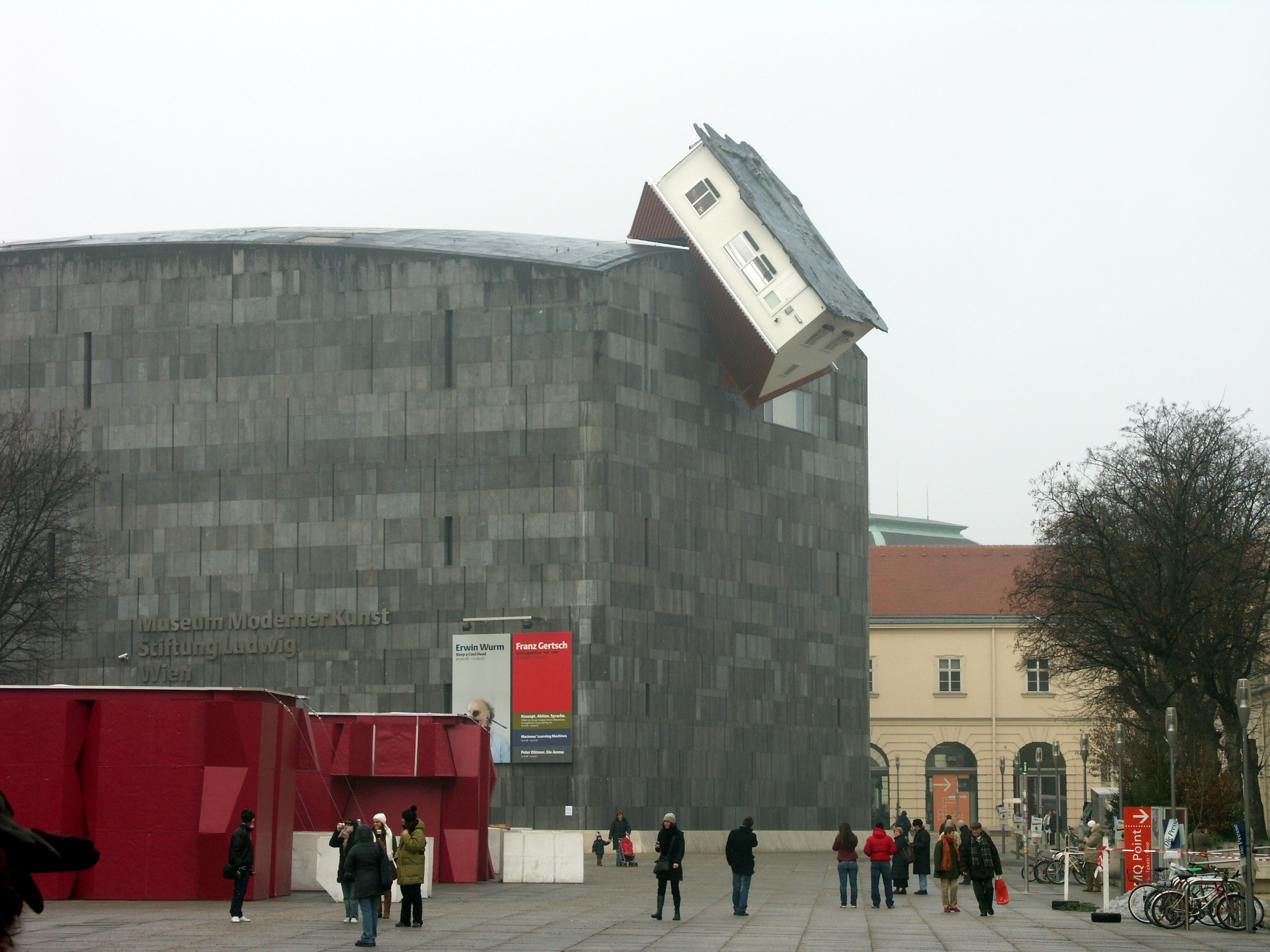
Mumok displays Erwin Wurm in 2007

Mumok, officially the Museum moderner Kunst Stiftung Ludwig Wien, (transl. Museum of modern art, Ludwig Foundation, Vienna) is a museum in the Museumsquartier in Vienna, Austria.

The museum has a collection of 10,000 modern and contemporary art works, including major works from Andy Warhol, Pablo Picasso, Joseph Beuys, Nam June Paik, Wolf Vostell, Gerhard Richter, Jasper Johns and Roy Lichtenstein. Over 230 art works were given to the museum by the German industrialist and art collector Peter Ludwig and his wife Irene in 1981.

Since 2001, the museum has been housed in a stone-clad building designed by Austrian architects Ortner & Ortner.

The Mumok regularly organizes special exhibitions and is known for its large collection of art related to Viennese Actionism.

== History ==
The mumok, Museum moderner Kunst Stiftung Ludwig Wien, was founded on 21 September 1962, as the Museum of the Twentieth Century (later the 20s House) in the Swiss Garden, located in the Austrian Pavilion that had been built by Karl Schwanzer for Expo 58 in Brussels, and was refurbished as an exhibition hall.

Founder director Werner Hofmann was given the task of setting up a collection of modern art. In just a few years he managed to purchase many significant works of classical modernism, and to expand the collection in a targeted manner based on the few works that were already held by the museum.

On 26 April 1979, the Palais Liechtenstein in Alsergrund was opened, and rented as a second exhibition building so as to gain more space for the museum. This opportunity was thanks to the efforts of Hans Mayr, the president of the Vienna Künstlerhaus at the time, who organized an exhibition with contemporary artworks from the Aachen collection of Peter and Irene Ludwig for Vienna in 1977.

While this show was still running, the Ludwigs agreed to provide a number of works on loan to Vienna. An Austrian committee, set up by national minister Herta Firnberg, conducted negotiations with the Ludwigs on the selection of works. Around one hundred loaned works were agreed in a first contract, but this number had nearly doubled by the time the new Vienna collection opened. The focus of this project was on pop art and photorealism, as had been the case in the 1977 exhibition. In 1978, the Cologne collection of Wolfgang Hahn with its holdings in nouveau réalisme and Fluxus was acquired, thus quickly expanding the museum's collection.

In 1981, the Austrian Ludwig Foundation was established, by Herta Firnberg and Peter and Irene Ludwig, and about a third of the hitherto loaned works from the Ludwig collection was now transferred into the possession of the foundation. In return, the Republic of Austria committed to an annual guaranteed payment to the foundation with which further artworks could be purchased. On the occasion of the tenth anniversary of the foundation in 1991 the museum received a further gift. By way of thanks to the Austrian Ludwig Foundation for donating such significant modernist works of art, the minister of science at the time, Erhard Busek, concluded a contract with the foundation in which the name Museum moderner Kunst Stiftung Ludwig Wien was agreed.

On 15 September 2001, the Museum moderner Kunst Stiftung Ludwig Wien was reopened in the MuseumsQuartier in Vienna's historical center. This cubic building clad in basalt lava was built by architects Ortner & Ortner, and provides 4,800 m^{2} of exhibition space for monographic or thematic exhibitions and alternating presentations of the museum's own collection, which now contain some 10,000 works of modernist and contemporary art.

== Collection ==
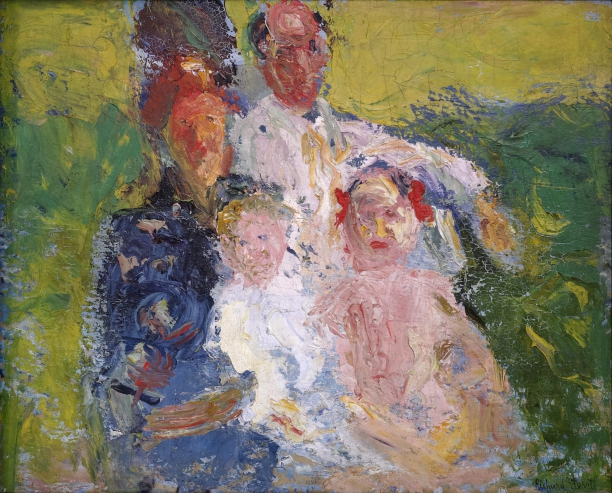
Schönberg Family by Richard Gerstl

The mumok collection today comprises around 10,000 works by c. 1,600 artists. In 1959, the first purchases were made for the newly founded Museum des 20. Jahrhunderts, which held 90 works when officially opened in 1962. A key impulse for the museum's exhibition and collecting policy was provided by the Ludwig and Hahn Collections in the 1970s, which were shown from 1979 in a second building, the Palais Liechtenstein. The Hahn Collection was purchased by the Republic of Austria, whereas the loans by Peter and Irene Ludwig were permanently guaranteed for the museum by establishing the Austrian Ludwig Foundation. The Republic of Austria agreed in turn to provide a budget that has enabled the Foundation to expand its collection of key works of international modernist and contemporary art – to this day. The mumok collection consists of several "blocks" that correspond to the different stages in the museum's history. The period to after World War Two is covered by holdings in classical modernism that were purchased by the museum's founding director, Werner Hofmann. A further focus is the Ludwig and Hahn Collections, with their emphasis on the avant-gardes of the 1960s and 1970s. In the last 15 years a comprehensive collection of Vienna Actionism has been built up. mumok collects contemporary art with an emphasis on photography, video, and film, as well as painting, sculpture, and installations, works which have mainly been added to the collection over the last two decades.

== Directors ==
- 2001–2010: Edelbert Köb
- 2010–2024: Karola Kraus
- 2025–: Fatima Hellberg
