= List of compositions by Arnold Schoenberg =

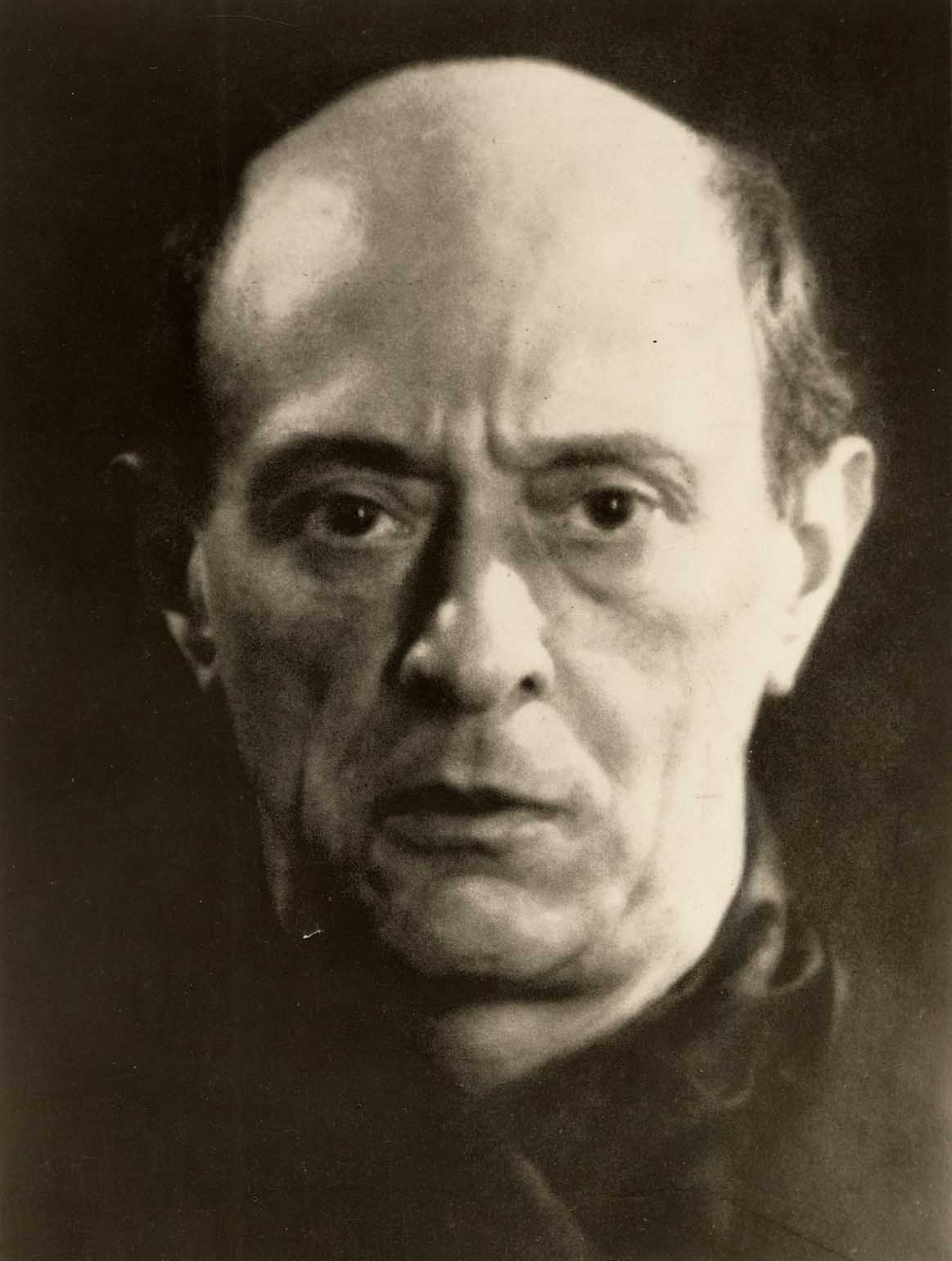
Schoenberg by Man Ray (1927)

The following is a list of compositions by Arnold Schoenberg.

== Compositions with opus numbers ==
Op. No.	Title	Year(s) of composition
1	Zwei Gesänge [Two Songs] for baritone	1898
2	Vier Lieder [Four Songs]	1899/1900
3	Sechs Lieder [Six Songs]	1899/1903
4	Verklärte Nacht [Transfigured Night]	1899
5	Pelleas und Melisande	1902/03
6	Acht Lieder [Eight Songs] for soprano	1903/05
7	String Quartet No. 1, D minor	1904/05
8	Sechs Lieder [Six Songs] with orchestra	1903/05
9	Kammersymphonie [Chamber symphony] No. 1, E major	1906
10	String Quartet No. 2, F♯ minor (with Soprano)	1907/08
11	Drei Klavierstücke	1909
12	Zwei Balladen [Two Ballads]	1906
13	Friede auf Erden [Peace on Earth]	1907
14	Zwei Lieder [Two Songs]	1907/08
15	15 Gedichte aus Das Buch der hängenden Gärten (15 Poems from The Book of the Hanging Gardens) by Stefan George	1908/09
16	Fünf Orchesterstücke [Five Pieces for Orchestra]	1909
17	Erwartung [Expectation], monodrama in one act, for soprano and orchestra	1909
18	Die glückliche Hand [The lucky hand], drama with music, for voices and orchestra	1910/13
19	Sechs kleine Klavierstücke [Six little piano pieces]	1911
20	Herzgewächse [Foliage of the heart] for soprano, celesta, harmonium, harp	1911
21	Pierrot Lunaire	1912
22	Four Orchestral Songs	1913/16
23	Fünf Stücke [Five Pieces] for Piano	1920/23
24	Serenade	1920/23
25	Suite for Piano	1921/23
26	Wind Quintet	1924
27	Vier Stücke [Four Pieces]	1925
28	Drei Satiren [Three Satires]	1925/26
29	Suite, for septet	1924/26
30	String Quartet No. 3	1927
31	Variations for Orchestra	1926/28
32	Von heute auf morgen [From today to tomorrow] opera in one act	1928
33	Zwei Klavierstücke [2 Piano Pieces]	1928/31
34	Begleitungsmusik zu einer Lichtspielscene [Accompaniment to a Film Scene]	1930
35	Sechs Stücke [Six Pieces] for male chorus	1930
36	Violin Concerto	1934/36
37	String Quartet No. 4	1936
38	Kammersymphonie [Chamber symphony] No. 2, E♭ minor	1906/39
39	Kol nidre for chorus and orchestra	1938
40	Variations in D minor on a recitative for Organ	1941
41	Ode to Napoleon Buonaparte for voice, piano and string quartet	1942
42	Piano Concerto	1942
43a	Theme and Variations for Band	1943
43b	Theme and Variations for Orchestra	1943
44	Prelude to Genesis Suite for chorus and orchestra	1945
45	String Trio	1946
46	A Survivor from Warsaw	1947
47	Phantasy for violin and piano	1949
48	Three Songs	1933
49	Three Folksongs	1948
50a	Dreimal tausend Jahre [Three times a thousand years]	1949
50b	Psalm 130 "De profundis"	1950
50c	Modern psalm	unfinished

== Works by genre ==
=== Operas ===
- Erwartung [Expectation], monodrama for soprano and orchestra, Op. 17 (1909)
- Die glückliche Hand [The Hand of Fate], drama with music, for voices and orchestra, Op. 18 (1910–13)
- Von heute auf morgen [From Today to Tomorrow], opera in one act, Op. 32 (1928–29)
- Moses und Aron [Moses and Aaron], opera in three acts (1930–32, unfinished)

=== Orchestral ===
- Frühlings Tod, in A minor, symphonic poem (Source: Malcolm McDonald, Schoenberg, "Master Musicians Series", J.M. Dent London)
- Gavotte and Musette in G Major for Strings (ibid.)
- Pelleas und Melisande, Op. 5 (1902/03)
- Kammersymphonie [Chamber Symphony] No. 1, E major, Op. 9 (1906)
- Fünf Orchesterstücke [5 Pieces for Orchestra], Op. 16 (1909)
- Variations for Orchestra, Op. 31 (1926/28)
- Suite in G major for string orchestra ("In the Old Style") (1934)
- Kammersymphonie [Chamber symphony] No. 2, E♭ minor, Op. 38 (1906/39)
- Theme and Variations, in G minor Op. 43b (1943)

=== Concertos ===
- Cello Concerto "after Monn's Concerto in D major for harpsichord" (1932/33)
- Concerto for String Quartet and Orchestra, "freely adapted from Handel's Concerto grosso in B♭ major, Op. 6, No. 7" (1933)
- Violin Concerto, Op. 36 (1934/36)
- Piano Concerto, Op. 42 (1942)

=== Vocal/choral orchestral ===
- 6 Lieder [6 Songs] with orchestra, Op. 8 (1903/05)
- Gurre-Lieder [Songs of Gurre] (1901/11)
- 4 Lieder [4 Songs] for Voice and Orchestra, Op. 22 (1913/16)
- Kol nidre for Chorus and Orchestra, Op. 39 (1938)
- Prelude to Genesis Suite for Chorus and Orchestra, Op. 44 (1945)
- A Survivor from Warsaw, Op. 46 (1947)

=== Band ===
- Theme and Variations, Op. 43a (1943)

=== Chamber ===
- Notturno for Harp and Strings, also known as Adagio für Streicher und Harfe (1896)
- Serenade in D major (first movement; a scherzo, slow movement, and finale partially completed. 1896)
- String Quartet
  - Presto, in C major for String Quartet (1894(?))
  - String Quartet in D major (1897)
  - Scherzo, in F major, and Trio in a minor for String Quartet, rejected from D major String Quartet (1897)
  - String Quartet No. 1, D minor, Op. 7 (1904/05)
  - String Quartet No. 2, F♯ minor (with soprano), Op. 10 (1907/08)
  - String Quartet No. 3, Op. 30 (1927)
  - String Quartet No. 4, Op. 37 (1936)
  - String Quartet No. 5, (1949), fragments
- untitled work in D minor for violin and piano (unknown year)
- Verklärte Nacht [Transfigured Night] (string sextet), Op. 4 (1899)
- Ein Stelldichein [A Rendezvous] for Mixed Quintet (1905), fragment
- Three pieces for Chamber Ensemble (1910)
- Die eiserne Brigade [The Iron Brigade] for Piano Quintet (1916)
- Serenade, for seven players, Op. 24 (1920/23)
- Weihnachtsmusik [Christmas music] for two violins, cello, harmonium, and piano (1921)
- Wind Quintet, Op. 26 (1924) 1. Schwungvoll, 2. Anmutig und heiter: Scherzando, 3. Etwas langsam, 4. Rondo
- Suite for three clarinets (E♭, B♭, and bass), violin, viola, violoncello and piano, Op. 29 (1925) (with ossia flute and bassoon parts substituting for E♭ and bass clarinet)
- Sonata for violin and piano (1927) (a 43-bar fragment)
- Suite for Strings in G Major in five movements (1934)
- Fanfare on motifs of Die Gurre-Lieder (11 brass instruments and percussion) (1945)
- String Trio, Op. 45 (1946)
- Phantasy for violin and piano, Op. 47 (1949)

=== Keyboard ===
- Drei Klavierstücke [3 Pieces] (1894)
- 6 Stücke [6 Pieces] for 4 hands (1896)
- Scherzo (Gesamtausgabe fragment 1) (ca. 1894)
- Leicht, mit einiger Unruhe [Lightly with some restlessness], C♯ minor (Gesamtausgabe fragment 2) (ca. 1900)
- Langsam [Slowly], A♭ major (Gesamtausgabe fragment 3) (1900/01)
- Wenig bewegt, sehr zart [Calmly, very gentle], B♭ major (Gesamtausgabe fragment 4) (1905/06)
- 2 Stücke [2 Pieces] (Gesamtausgabe fragments 5a & 5b) (1909)
- Drei Klavierstücke, Op. 11 (1909)
- Stück [Piece] (Gesamtausgabe fragment 6) (1909)
- Stück [Piece] (Gesamtausgabe fragment 7) (1909)
- Stück [Piece] (Gesamtausgabe fragment 8) (ca. 1910)
- Sechs kleine Klavierstücke, Op. 19 (1911)
- Mäßig, aber sehr ausdrucksvoll [Measured, but very expressive] (Gesamtausgabe fragment 9) (March 1918)
- Langsam [Slowly] (Gesamtausgabe fragment 10) (Summer 1920)
- Stück [Piece] (Gesamtausgabe fragment 11) (Summer 1920)
- Fünf Klavierstücke, Op. 23 (1923)
- Langsame Halbe [Slow half-notes], B (Gesamtausgabe fragment 12) (1925)
- Suite, Op. 25 (1921/23)
- Klavierstück, Op. 33a (1929)
- Klavierstück, Op. 33b (1931)
- Quarter note = mm. 80 (Gesamtausgabe fragment 13) (February 1931)
- Sehr rasch; Adagio [Very fast; Slowly] (Gesamtausgabe fragment 14) (July 1931)
- Andante (Gesamtausgabe fragment 15) (10 October 1931)
- Piece (Gesamtausgabe fragment 16) (after October 1933)
- Moderato (Gesamtausgabe fragment 17) (April 1934?)
- Organ Sonata (fragments) (1941)

=== Choral ===
- Ei, du Lütte [Oh, you little one] (late 1890s)
- Friede auf Erden [Peace on Earth], Op. 13 (1907)
- Die Jakobsleiter [Jacob's Ladder] (1917/22, unfinished)
- 3 Satiren [3 Satires], Op. 28 (1925/26)
- 3 Volksliedsätze [3 Folksong Movements] (1929)
- 6 Stücke [6 Pieces] for Male Chorus, Op. 35 (1930)
- 3 Folksongs, Op. 49 (1948)
- Dreimal tausend Jahre [Three Times a Thousand Years], Op. 50a (1949)
- Psalm 130 "De profundis", Op. 50b (1950)
- Modern Psalm, Op. 50c (1950, unfinished)

=== Songs ===
- Gedenken (Es steht sein Bild noch immer da) [Remembrance (His picture is still there)] (1893/1903?)
- "In hellen Träumen hab' ich dich oft geschaut" [In vivid dreams so oft you appeared to me] (1893)
- 12 erste Lieder [12 First songs] (1893/96)
- "Ein Schilflied (Drüben geht die Sonne scheiden)" [A bulrush song (Yonder is the sun departing)] (1893)
- "Warum bist du aufgewacht" [Why have you awakened] (1893/94)
- "Waldesnacht, du wunderkühle" [Forest night, so wondrous cool] (1894/96)
- "Ecloge (Duftreich ist die Erde)" [Eclogue (Fragrant is the earth)] (1896/97)
- "Mädchenfrühling (Aprilwind, alle Knospen)" [Maiden's spring (April wind, all abud)] (1897)
- "Mädchenlied (Sang ein Bettlerpärlein am Schenkentor)" [Maiden's song (A pair of beggars sang at the pub's door)] (1897/1900)
- "Mailied (Zwischen Weizen und Korn)" [May song (Between wheat and grain)]
- "Nicht doch! (Mädel, lass das Stricken)" [But no! (Girl, stop knitting)] (1897)
- 2 Gesänge [2 Songs] for baritone, Op. 1 (1898)
- 4 Lieder [4 Songs], Op. 2 (1899)
- 6 Lieder [6 Songs], Op. 3 (1899/1903)
- "Die Beiden (Sie trug den Becher in der Hand)" [The two (She carried the goblet in her hand)] (1899)
- "Mannesbangen (Du musst nicht meinen)" [Men's worries (You should not think)] (1899)
- "Gruss in die Ferne (Dunkelnd über den See)" [Hail from afar (Darkened over the sea)] (August 1900). Text by Hermann Lingg (1868)
- 8 Brettllieder [8 Cabaret songs] (1901)
- "Deinem Blick mich zu bequemen" [To submit to your sweet glance] (1903)
- 8 Lieder [8 Songs] for soprano, Op. 6 (1903/05)
- 2 Balladen [2 Ballads], Op. 12 (1906)
- 2 Lieder [2 Songs], Op. 14 (1907/08)
- 15 Gedichte aus Das Buch der hängenden Gärten [15 Poems from The book of the Hanging Gardens] by Stefan George, Op. 15 (1908/09)
- "Am Strande" [At the seashore] (1909)
- Herzgewächse [Foliage of the heart] for high soprano (with harp, celesta & harmonium) Op. 20 (1911)
- Pierrot lunaire, Op. 21 (1912) (reciter with 5 instruments)
- "Petrarch-Sonnet" from Serenade, Op. 24 (1920/23) (bass with 7 instruments)
- 4 Deutsche Volkslieder [4 German folksongs] (1929)
- Ode to Napoleon Buonaparte for voice, piano and string quartet, Op. 41 (1942). Based on Lord Byron's poem of the same name.
- 3 Songs, Op. 48 (1933)

=== Canons ===
- O daß der Sinnen doch so viele sind! [Oh, the senses are too numerous!] (Bärenreiter I) (April? 1905) (4 voices)
- Wenn der schwer Gedrückte klagt [When the sore oppressed complains] (Bärenreiter II) (April? 1905) (4 voices)
- Wer mit der Welt laufen will [He who wants to run with the world] (for David Bach) (Bärenreiter XXI) (March 1926; July 1934) (3 voices)
- Canon (Bärenreiter IV) (April 1926) (4 voices)
- Von meinen Steinen [From my stones] (for Erwin Stein) (Bärenreiter V) (December 1926) (4 voices)
- Arnold Schönberg beglückwünschst herzlichst Concert Gebouw [Arnold Schoenberg congratulates the Concert Gebouw affectionately] (Bärenreiter VI) (March 1928) (5 voices)
- Mirror canon with two free middle voices, A major (Bärenreiter VIII) (April 1931) (4 voices)
- Jedem geht es so [No man can escape] (for Carl Engel) (Bärenreiter XIII) (April 1933; text 1943) (3 voices)
- Mir auch ist es so ergangen [I, too, was not better off] (for Carl Engel) (Bärenreiter XIV) (April 1933; text 1943) (3 voices)
- Perpetual canon, A minor (Bärenreiter XV) (1933) (4 voices)
- Mirror canon, A minor (Bärenreiter XVI) (1933) (4 voices)
- Es ist zu dumm [It is too dumb] (for Rudolph Ganz) (Bärenreiter XXII) (September 1934) (4 voices)
- Man mag über Schönberg denken, wie man will [One might think about Schoenberg any way one wants to] (for Charlotte Dieterle) (Bärenreiter XXIII) (1935) (4 voices)
- Double canon (Bärenreiter XXV) (1938) (4 voices)
- Mr. Saunders I owe you thanks (for Richard Drake Saunders) (Bärenreiter XXVI) (December 1939) (4 voices)
- I am almost sure, when your nurse will change your diapers (for Artur Rodzinsky on the birth of his son Richard) (Bärenreiter XXVIII) (March 1945) (4 voices)
- Canon for Thomas Mann on his 70th birthday (Bärenreiter XXIX) (June 1945) (2 violins, viola, violoncello)
- Gravitationszentrum eigenen Sonnensystems [You are the center of gravity of your own solar system] (Bärenreiter XXX) (August 1949) (4 voices)

=== Transcriptions and arrangements ===
- Bach: Chorale prelude on "Schmücke dich, o liebe Seele" [Deck thyself, oh dear soul], BWV 654 (arr. 1922: orchestra)
- Bach: Chorale prelude on "Komm, Gott Schöpfer, Heiliger Geist" [Come, God, Creator, Holy ghost], BWV 631 (arr. 1922: orchestra)
- Bach: Prelude and fugue in E♭ major "St Anne", BWV 552 (arr. 1928: orchestra)
- Brahms: Piano quartet in G minor, Op. 25 (arr. 1937: orchestra)
- Busoni: Berceuse élégiaque, Op. 42 (arr. 1920: flute, clarinet, string quintet, piano, harmonium)
- Denza: Funiculì, Funiculà (arr. 1921: voice, clarinet, mandolin, guitar, violin, viola, violoncello)
- Mahler: Das Lied von der Erde [The Song of the Earth] (arr. Arnold Schoenberg & Anton Webern, 1921; completed by Rainer Riehn, 1983: soprano, flute & piccolo, oboe & English horn, clarinet, bassoon & contrabassoon, horn, harmonium, piano, 2 violins, viola, violoncello, double bass)
- Mahler: Lieder eines fahrenden Gesellen [Songs of a Wayfarer] (arr. 1920: voice, flute, clarinet, harmonium, piano, 2 violins, viola, violoncello, double bass, percussion)
- Monn: Concerto for cello in G minor, transcribed and adapted from Monn's Concerto for harpsichord (1932/33)
- Max Reger: Eine romantische Suite [A Romantic Suite], Op. 125 (arr. Arnold Schoenberg & Rudolf Kolisch, 1919/1920: flute, clarinet, 2 violins, viola, violoncello, harmonium for 4 hands, piano for 4 hands)
- Schubert: Rosamunde, Fürstin von Zypern Incidental music, D. 797 (arr. 1903?: piano for 4 hands)
- Schubert: Ständchen [Serenade], D. 889 (arr. 1921: voice, clarinet, bassoon, mandolin, guitar, 2 violins, viola, violoncello)
- Sioly: Weil i a alter Drahrer bin [For I'm a real old gadabout] (arr. 1921: clarinet, mandolin, guitar, violin, viola, violoncello)
- Johann Strauss II: Kaiser-Walzer [Emperor Waltz], Op. 437 (arr. 1925: flute, clarinet, 2 violins, viola, violoncello, piano)
- Johann Strauss II: Rosen aus dem Süden [Roses from the South], Op. 388 (arr. 1921: harmonium, piano, 2 violins, viola, violoncello)
- Johann Strauss II: Lagunenwalzer [Lagoon Waltz], Op. 411 (arr. 1921: harmonium, piano, 2 violins, viola, violoncello)

== See also ==
- Arnold Schönberg complete edition
