= Die glückliche Hand =

1924 opera by Arnold Schoenberg

- Opera by Arnold Schoenberg
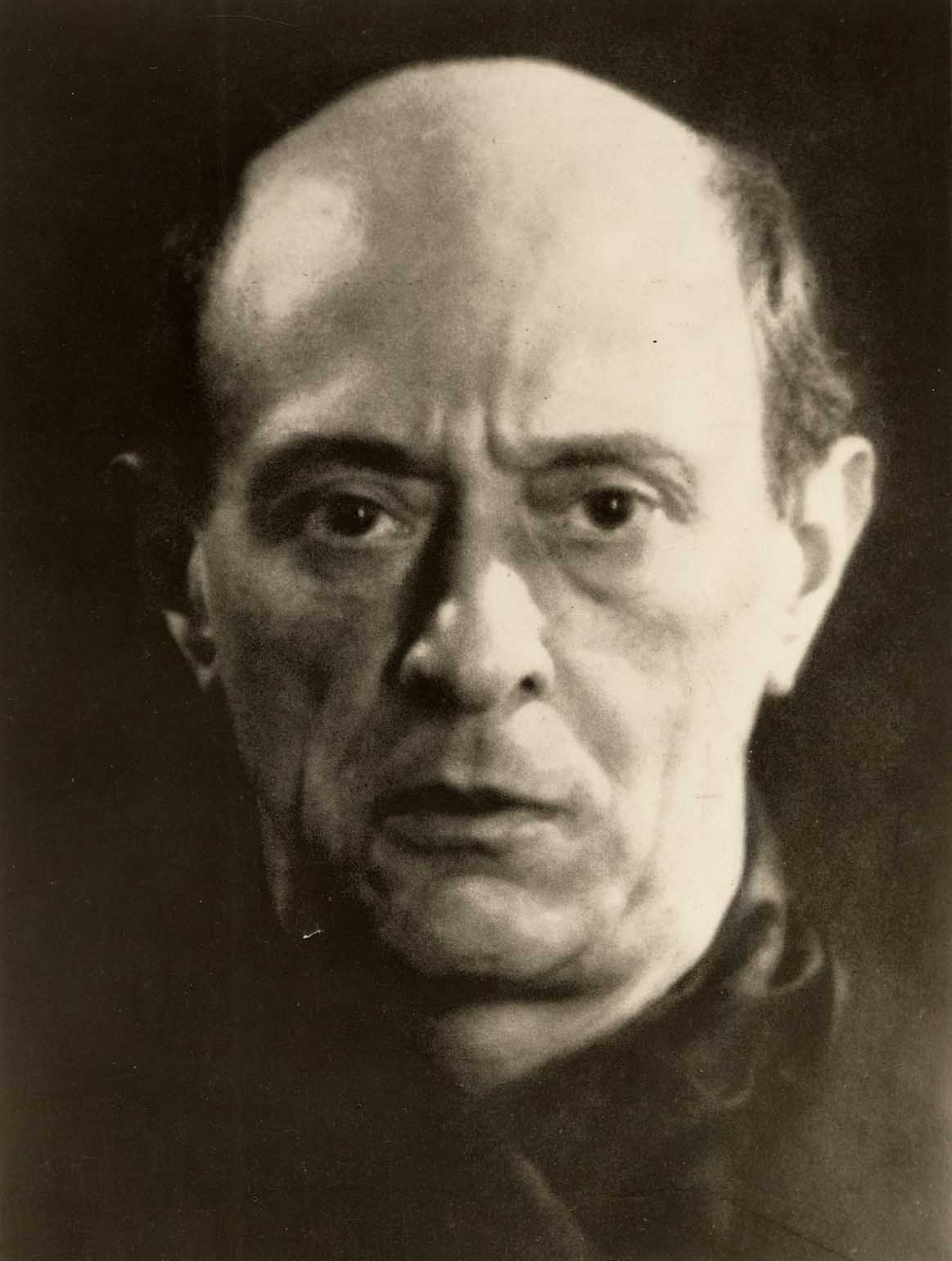
- The composer in 1927
- Translation: The Lucky Hand
- Language: German
- Premiere: 24 October 1924; Vienna Volksoper, Vienna

Die glückliche Hand (The Lucky Hand, (Note: Glücklich may be translated as lucky, fortunate, or favored. English renderings include The Lucky/Fortunate/Favored/Fated Hand, The Hand of Fate, and The Gifted Touch.) 1909–1913), Op. 18, is a four-scene opera or "Drama with Music in One Act" by Arnold Schoenberg to his own libretto. Like Erwartung (Expectation, 1909), it drew on Otto Weininger's book Sex and Character and reflected Schoenberg's own life, perhaps including his sense of artistic mission, audience reception, wife's affair, or some combination. It conveys the idea that man repeats his mistakes. The Vienna Volksoper premiered it on 24 October 1924.

== Background and creation ==
Die glückliche Hand (The Lucky Hand) is a four-scene opera or "Drama with Music in One Act" by Arnold Schoenberg. A Künstleroper (artist-opera) and ich-Drama (I-drama or ego-drama), it bridges late-Romantic Gesamtkunstwerk and experimental theater. He wrote it to his own libretto during a turbulent, productive time in his life, split between imperial Vienna, where artists turned inward amid the Habsburg monarchy's decline, and more progressive Berlin (1901–03, 1911–15, 1926–33).

=== Compositional means ===
Following his early Brahmsian–Wagnerian works, Schoenberg stretched tonality past key centers in his String Quartet No. 2, Op. 10 (1907–08) and dropped key signatures in Book of the Hanging Gardens, Op. 15 (1908–09). In Harmonielehre (Theory of Harmony, 1910), he discussed what he later called the "emancipation of the dissonance", (Note: Schoenberg first used this expression in his essay "Gesinnung oder Erkenntnis?" ("Opinion or Insight?", 1925).) trying it in a spate of atonal, expressionist music: (Note: Schoenberg didn't like these labels.)

- Three Piano Pieces, Op. 11 (February–August 1909) (Note: No. 3, finished last, is particularly expressionist.)
- Five Pieces for Orchestra, Op. 16 (May–August 1909)
- Die glückliche Hand (The Lucky Hand), Op. 18 (June 1909 – November 1913)
- Erwartung (Expectation), Op. 17 (August–September 1909)
- Six Little Piano Pieces, Op. 19 (February–June 1911)
- Herzgewächse (Foliage of the Heart), Op. 20 (December 1911)
- Pierrot lunaire (Moonstruck Pierrot), Op. 21 (March–July 1912)

Written during each year of this outpouring and completed at its end, Lucky Hand spans a phase when Schoenberg was seeking new compositional means. He composed early sections spontaneously as in Erwartung, using a quasi-stream-of-consciousness method to inject and amplify psychodrama. (Note: The Woman in Erwartung lost in the woods may reflect Schoenberg's own search.) He carefully sketched later sections, like scene 3's fugato opening, after Pierrot, having reconciled atonality with familiar musical forms.

Working with monologists at the Überbrettl cabaret (1901–02) may have influenced his use of Sprechstimme (half speech, half song), including in Lucky Hand. (Note: Engelbert Humperdinck first used Sprechstimme in Königskinder (1897). Schoenberg asked that his 1899 musical setting of Hugo von Hofmannsthal's "Die Beiden" be "less sung than declaimed" and first used Sprechstimme in Gurre-Lieder.) This and his work orchestrating many operettas during their Silver Age heyday may have led to his evocative and sometimes spatial use or parody of light music, not unlike Gustav Mahler or Charles Ives. In Lucky Hand, he used derisive laughter, often with a small, off-stage wind band, as prolepsis (scene 1 m. 26; obliquely: scene 3 mm. 104 and 125) and anagnorisis (reprise: scene 3 m. 200). (Note: Op. 16/iv "Peripetie" ("Peripeteia") has been interpreted as being about his turns of fortune, including in terms of audience reception.) Waltz-like passages, often involving violin, are like leitmotifs for the Woman (e.g., scene 2 m. 30, scene 3 m. 156).

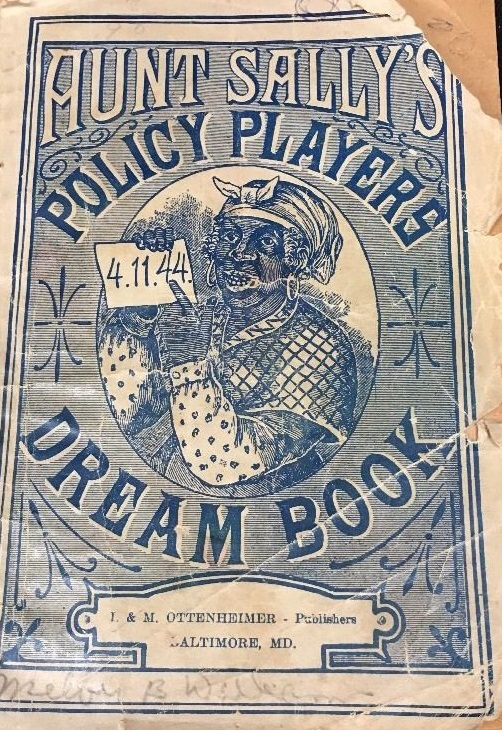
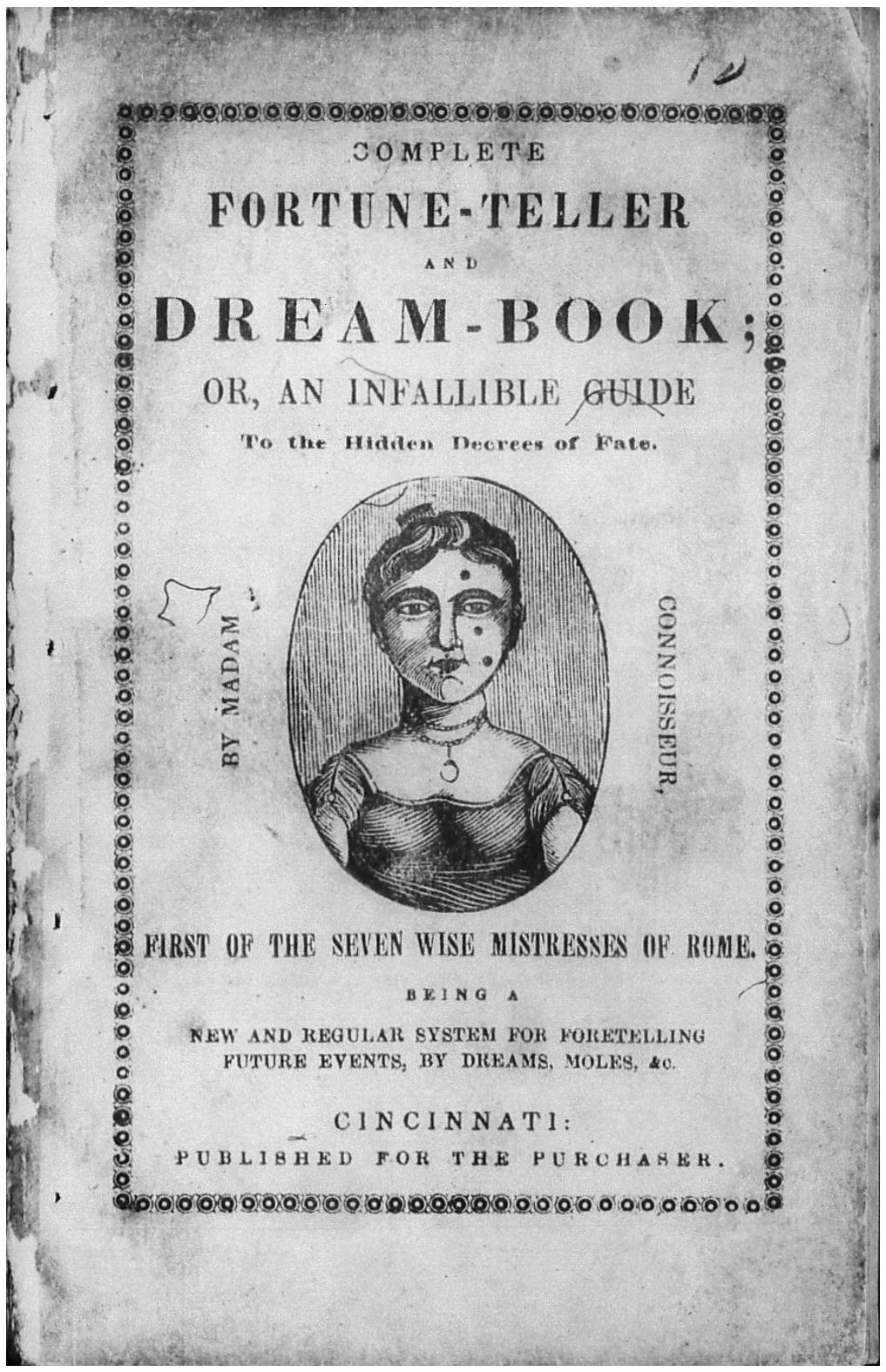
19th-century dream books showing a gambling play (left) and promising an "infallible" fate divination system (right)

Like Erwartung, Pierrot, and parts of Moses und Aron (1923–37), Lucky Hand may be considered a dreamlike monodrama. But it should be more abstract and surreal than a dream, Schoenberg wrote his publisher, Emil Hertzka at Universal Edition, regarding its unrealized filming. Some would have known psychoanalyst Sigmund Freud's The Interpretation of Dreams (1900), (Note: Sigmund Freud and physician Josef Breuer discussed Bertha Pappenheim, Erwartung librettist Marie Pappenheim's cousin, as "Anna O." in Studies on Hysteria (1895).) and many consulted, whether for guidance or gambling, more popular dream books (Losbücher), shaping cultural imagination. In writing Lucky Hand, Schoenberg may have used these latter books' color symbolism and numerology, purportedly drawn from ancient works like Artemidorus' Oneirocritica.

=== Literary–dramatic connections ===
In Lucky Hand, the dreamer (the Man) is an artisan. He forges a diadem in one hammer blow (set to a tertian chord of twelve tones, scene 3 m. 115), recalling the forging scene from Wagner's opera Siegfried (1851–1871). He is then seized as if by pangs of emotion in an overwhelming storm of light (the "color crescendo", scene 3 m. 126), an episode echoed in Thomas Mann's novel Doctor Faustus (1947), whose quasi-Schoenbergian genius gains artistic inspiration and visions via syphilitic seizures in a deal with the Devil. (Note: Schoenberg was known for writing some music swiftly when inspired. In "Composition with Twelve Tones" (1941), he later wrote that the creative process was more often a "long path [...] where, driven out of Paradise, even geniuses must reap their harvest in the sweat of their brows.")

=== Personal relationships ===
Tragic love, recurring in Schoenberg's work since Verklärte Nacht (1899), Gurre-Lieder (1900–03, 1910–11), and Pelleas und Melisande (1902–03), turned personal in 1908. His wife Mathilde, a pianist and composer Alexander von Zemlinsky's sister, left him for a mutual friend and colleague, Fauvist and Expressionist painter Richard Gerstl. Composition student Anton Webern helped convince her to return to Schoenberg and their two children. Gerstl died by suicide, and Schoenberg may have also contemplated suicide while processing this psychological trauma in Lucky Hand and other works from this time, which often express anxiety. (Note: His son-in-law Felix Greissle tied Lucky Hand to this crisis.)

Mathilde handled some clerical work for the opera. After frequent illness she died in 1923; Schoenberg self-medicated and wrote a requiem text. In 1924 he married Gertrud Kolisch (pseudonym: "Max Blonda"), sister of the Kolisch Quartet's first violinist Rudolf Kolisch. They collaborated on the Zeitoper (opera of the time) Von heute auf morgen (From Today to Tomorrow, 1928–29). She made a 1930 schematic of Lucky Hand's "color crescendo".

=== Visual arts nexus ===
Schoenberg created portraits, abstract and naturalistic studies, caricatures, and scenic designs, including for Lucky Hand. In Alliance (Hands) (1910), he painted two mirrored forms in inseparable union. He emphasized eyes rather than faces in portraits, as also in the stage directions for Erwartung and Lucky Hand. A 1910 solo exhibition of forty works at Hugo Heller's bookstore in Vienna was followed by group shows with Wassily Kandinsky, Franz Marc, Henri Rousseau, and Egon Schiele. Mahler was an anonymous patron. (Note: Schoenberg's recent music had been so poorly received that he took the stage only to keep his back to applause at the 1913 premiere of Gurre-Lieder. His Walking Self-Portrait (1911) may reflect his feelings.)

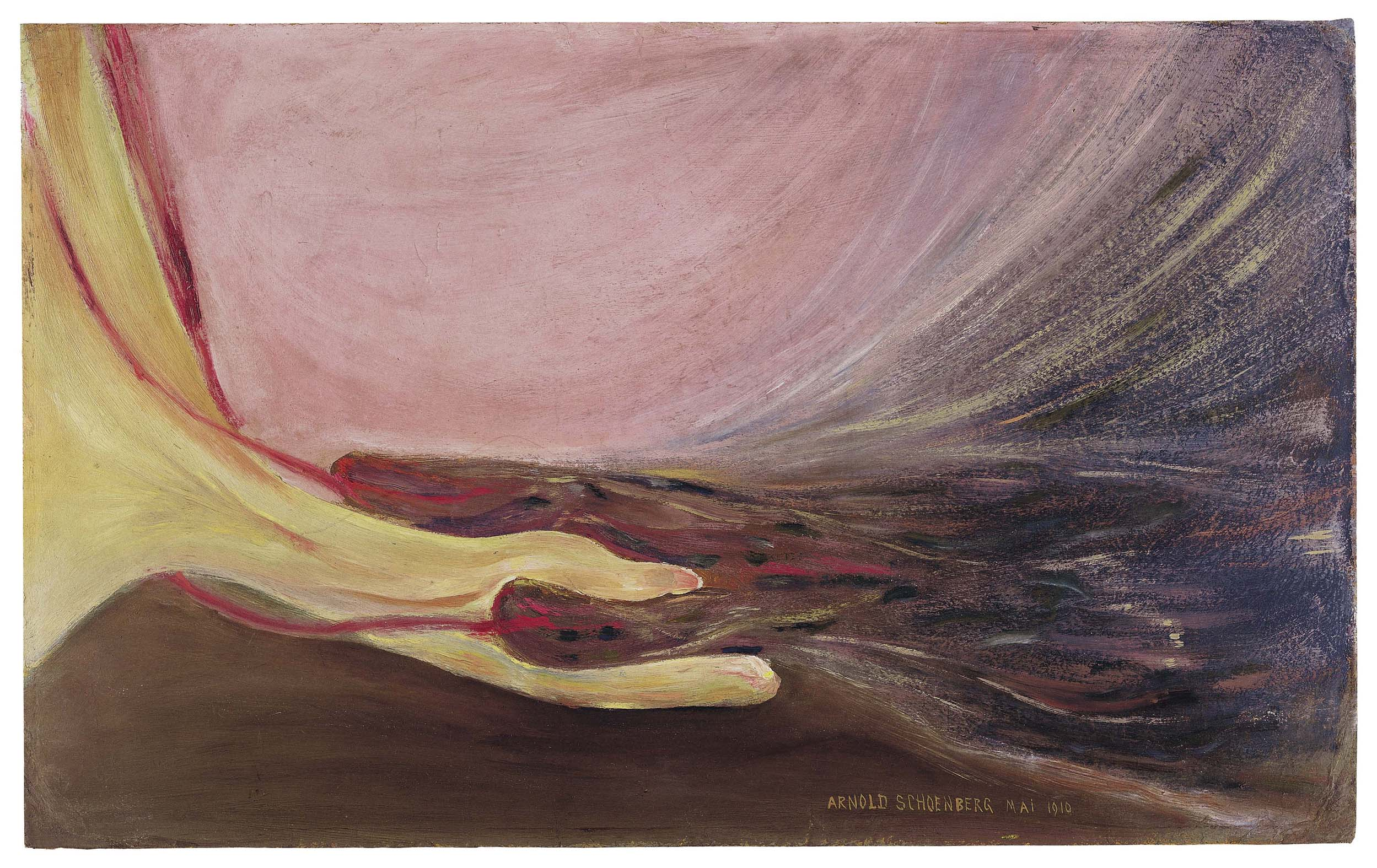
Alliance (Hands), 1910, by Arnold Schoenberg

Schoenberg's ideas about music and color came from dream books, the German Romantics (who drew on older texts), musicians, and teaching, including Guido Adler's students, Webern and Egon Wellesz. His music inspired Kandinsky's painting Impression III—Concert (1911) and a correspondence. (Note: Kandinsky and Marc included Herzgewächse in Der Blaue Reiter (The Blue Rider, 1912). Artist Paul Klee, also a musician, reviewed the Reiter and attended a 1913 Pierrot performance. Klee's New Harmony (1936) has twelve mirrored colors, perhaps after Schoenberg.) Citing Schoenberg's Harmonielehre in On the Spiritual in Art (1911), (Note: Kandinsky partly translated and published Schoenberg's Harmonielehre into Russian. He also cited others' work (e.g., physician Franz Freudenberg, composer Alexander Scriabin, musicologist Leonid Sabaneyev, painters Claude Monet and the Fauves).) Kandinsky linked free use of sound and color as he moved toward abstraction.

Sketches suggest Schoenberg used dream books' popular color symbolism in Lucky Hand (e.g., blue for sadness, green for hope, red for love or pain, yellow for jealousy, black for persecution, violet for comfort). In scene 3, the "color crescendo" syncs expressionist music, psychodrama, and colorful lighting, reflecting Romantic and modernist interest in synaesthesia and altered states of consciousness at the fin de siècle. (Note: Op. 16/iii "Farben" ("Colors") focused on orchestral timbre. Schoenberg's 1915 home had rooms of distinct colors and moods, Alma Mahler recalled.) Kandinsky's and Thomas de Hartmann's Der gelbe Klang (The Yellow Sound, 1909; one of Kandinsky's four "color dramas", 1909–14) had a similar scene of only abstract action, sound, and stage lighting.

=== Spiritual and sociopolitical context ===
Schoenberg's œuvre explores Sisyphean longing: first romantic (e.g., Hanging Gardens, Erwartung) and gradually spiritual (e.g., Moses, Modern Psalm). These latter elements emerged as he sought meaning and direction in works like Lucky Hand, Jakobsleiter (1914–22, rev. 1944; on Jacob's Ladder), and Der biblische Weg (1926–27, a Zionist play). Lucky Hand's thwarted visionary (the Man), unattainable form (the Woman), and voice of revelation (the quasi-Greek chorus) anticipate Moses und Aron, their conceptions of God, and the theophany of the burning bush respectively.

At the time of the Lucky Hand, Schoenberg compared art to a labyrinth and wrote Kandinsky that mimesis and hermeneutic interpretation led closer to what nonetheless lay beyond human comprehensibility, spurring further imagination and creativity. "[O]ne must not dream" about art, he later wrote in an essay, but rather "try hard to grasp [its] meaning."

The sparse, allegorical libretto and detailed stage directions, rich in Symbolist imagery and suggestion, stress ineffability, realized via stylized gesture, lighting, scenery, and dissonant, cinematic music with word painting. (Note: Music's association with ineffability is continuous with strands of German Romanticism.) Faint solo parts, hazy textures, and whispering (scenes 1 and 4) may evoke the call and response of congregants and cantors from his mother's Orthodox Jewish family. (Note: Anton Webern's choral music is comparatively clear and rhythmically straight.) The Woman's withdrawal when the Man drinks from the goblet (scene 2) may suggest apophatic theology.

Schoenberg theorized dissonance treatment through shifting conceptual metaphors, including many related to antisemitism (especially Wagner's). His innovation within tradition, and perhaps his social otherness within his milieu, is evident in his chromatically "emancipated" musical expression, as in the following melody (from scene 2 m. 36):

After Lucky Hand, he served in World War I, finished Four Orchestral Songs, Op. 22 (1913–16), and, while working on Jakobsleiter, continued to work through what would become a new compositional means, the twelve-tone technique. Born after Jewish emancipation and baptized Lutheran (1898), he would've always been seen as Jewish and confronted antisemitism repeatedly. He broke with Kandinsky over the Jewish question in 1922 and fled the Nazis in 1933 to Paris. There he formally returned to Judaism, witnessed by artist Marc Chagall.

== Drama and staging ==
=== Roles ===
- Ein Mann (a Man), baritone
- Ein Weib (a Woman), silent
- Ein Herr (a Gentleman), silent
- Chorus, Sprechstimme
  - 6 Frauen (Women); 3 sopranos, 3 altos
  - 6 Männer (Men); 3 tenors, 3 basses

=== Synopsis ===
The drama takes place in one act in which there are four scenes. It lasts about twenty minutes.
The staging of Lucky Hand is complex, due to the range of scenic effects that must be combined with the use of colored lights. These also prompt the Man's gestures, with hands, eyes, and body responding according to Schoenberg's stage directions.

The drama represents an inescapable cycle of man's plight as it starts and finishes with the male character struggling with the monster on his back. The male character sings about his love for a young woman (mime) but, despite this favor, she leaves him for a well-dressed gentleman (mime). He senses that she has left him and eventually, when she returns, he forgives her and his happiness returns. Again the woman retreats. The woman is seen later with the gentleman, and the male soloist implores the woman to stay with him but she escapes and kicks a rock at him. This rock turns into the monster that was originally seen on the man's back. Thus, the drama ends where it began.

== Instrumentation ==
The score calls for the following instrumentation.

Woodwinds

piccolo
3 flutes (3rd doubling on 2nd piccolo)
3 oboes
English horn
D clarinet
3 clarinets (in B♭ and A)
bass clarinet
3 bassoons
contrabassoon

Brass

4 horns
3 trumpets
4 trombones
bass tuba

Percussion

timpani
cymbals
bass drum
snare drum
tamtam
high and low bells
triangle
xylophone
glockenspiel
metal tubes
tambourine
hammer
celesta

Strings

harp

violins I
violins II
violas
cellos
double basses

The piece also employs an offstage ensemble consisting of piccolo, E♭ clarinet, horn, trumpet, 3 trombones, triangle and cymbals.

== See also ==
- 6-Z44, the Schoenberg hexachord – Musical motif representing Arnold Schoenberg
- Bluebeard's Castle – 1918 opera by Béla Bartók
- Mörder, Hoffnung der Frauen – Opera by Paul Hindemith
- Murderer, the Hope of Women – Play by Oskar Kokoschka
