= Suite for Piano (Schoenberg) =

Piece for piano by Arnold Schoenberg

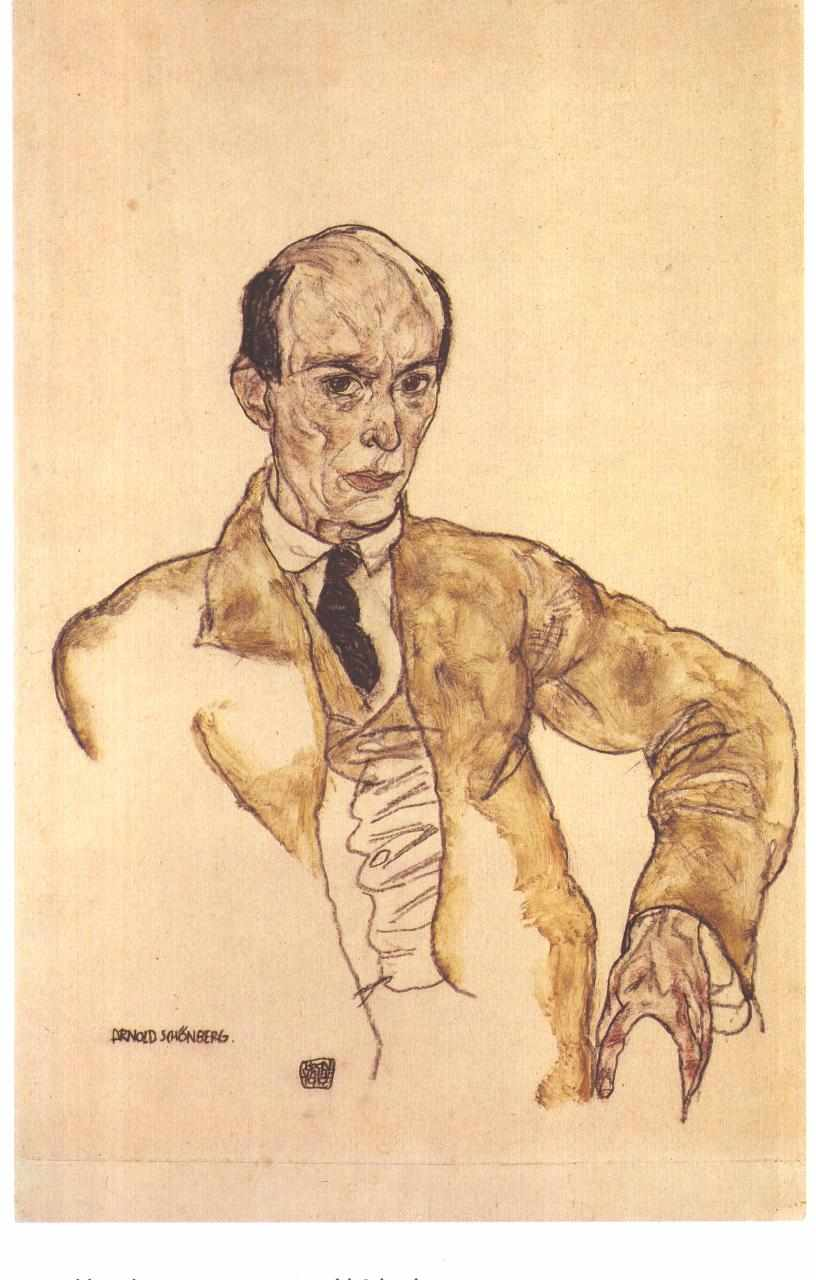
Portrait of Arnold Schoenberg by Egon Schiele, 1917

Arnold Schoenberg's Suite for Piano (German: Suite für Klavier), Op. 25, is a 12-tone piece for piano composed between 1921 and 1923. The work is the earliest in which Schoenberg employs a row of "12 tones related only to one another" in every movement: the earlier 5 Stücke, Op. 23 (1920–23) employs a 12-tone row only in the final waltz movement, and the Serenade, Op. 24, uses a single row in its central Sonnet.

The suite was first performed by Schoenberg's pupil Eduard Steuermann in Vienna on 25 February 1924. Steuermann made a commercial recording of the work in 1957. The first recording of the Suite for Piano to be released was made by Niels Viggo Bentzon some time before 1950.

A typical performance of the entire suite takes around 16 minutes.

== Music ==
In form and style, the work echoes many features of the Baroque suite. There are six movements:

1. Präludium (1921)
2. Gavotte (1923)
3. Musette (1923)
4. Intermezzo (1921–1923)
5. Menuett. Trio (1923)
6. Gigue (1923)

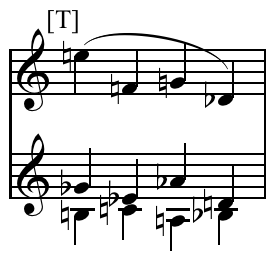
Polyphonic complex of three tetrachords from early sketch for Schoenberg's Suite for Piano, Op. 25. The bottom being the BACH motif in retrograde: HCAB.

The basic tone row of the suite consists of the following pitches: E–F–G–D♭–G♭–E♭–A♭–D–B–C–A–B♭. Schoenberg employs transpositions and inversions of the row for the first time: the sets employed are P-0, I-0, P-6, I-6 and their retrogrades. Arnold Whittall suggested that "[t]he choice of transpositions at the sixth semitone—the tritone—may seem the consequence of a desire to hint at 'tonic-dominant' relationships, and the occurrence of the tritone G–D♭ in all four sets is a hierarchical feature which Schoenberg exploits in several places".

The Gavotte movement contains "a parody of a baroque keyboard suite that involves the cryptogram of Bach's name as an important harmonic and melodic device" and a related quotation of Schoenberg's Op. 19/vi.

Edward T. Cone (1972) has catalogued what he believes to be a number of mistakes in Reinhold Brinkmann's 1968 revised edition of Schoenberg's piano music, one of which is in measure number five of the Suite's "Gavotte", G♭ instead of G♮. Henry Klumpenhouwer invokes Sigmund Freud's concept of parapraxes (i.e., mental slips) to suggest a psychological context explaining the deviation from the note predicted from the tone row.
