= Rudolph Reti =

Serbian musical analyst, composer and pianist

Rudolph Reti, also Réti (Serbian: Рудолф Рети, romanized: Rudolf Reti; November 27, 1885 – February 7, 1957), was a musical analyst, composer and pianist. He was the older brother of the chess master Richard Réti, but unlike his brother, Reti did not write his surname with an acute accent on the 'e'.

== Biography ==
Reti was born in Užice in the Kingdom of Serbia and studied music theory, musicology and piano in Vienna. Among his teachers was the pianist Eduard Steuermann, an eminent champion of Schoenberg and a supporter of modern music. Reti was in contact with Schoenberg at the time of that composer's earliest atonal works, and in 1911 gave the first performance of his Drei Klavierstücke Op.11.

Reti's compositions have not remained in the repertoire, but he was an active composer and received a number of high-profile performances. At the end of the first International Festival of Modern Music in Salzburg, in 1922, his 'Six Songs' were performed alongside Schoenberg's Second Quartet; three years later, at the 3rd ISCM Festival in Prague, his Concertino for Piano and Orchestra shared a programme with Martinu's 'Half-Time' and Vaughan Williams's 'A Pastoral Symphony'. In 1938, his David and Goliath Suite was performed by Eduard van Beinum and the Amsterdam Concertgebouw Orchestra. In 1948, Jean Sahlmark was the soloist in her husband's First Piano Concerto. Reti's output also includes several volumes of piano pieces and songs, an opera (Ivan and the Drum), as well as symphonic and choral music.

Between 1930 and 1938 Reti was chief music critic for the Austrian newspaper Das Echo. Together with the composer and musicologist Egon Wellesz, he was involved in establishing the International Festival of Modern Music, and founded the International Society for Contemporary Music in 1922. In 1939 Reti emigrated to the United States and later became an American citizen. He became a member of the American Musicological Society, and came to hold a fellowship at Yale. From 1943 he was married to the pianist, teacher, musicologist and editor Jean Sahlmark, who helped prepare for publication his two posthumous books. He died in Montclair, New Jersey.

Reti is best remembered today for his distinctive method of musical analysis, which he claimed revealed the 'thematic process' in music. His approach did not concern itself, however, with tracing the obvious thematic and motivic 'developments' displayed on the musical 'surface', but rather sought to demonstrate the way in which surface thematic variety is underpinned by a less apparent unity. For Reti, "the different movements of a classical symphony are built from one identical thought", [TPM, p. 13] and the composer "strives toward homogeneity in the inner essence but at the same time towards variety in the outer appearance. Therefore he changes the surface but maintains the substance of his shapes." [TPM, p. 13]

Reti's way of showing 'maintained substance' would usually involve constructing a music example which juxtaposed a number of contrasting themes; the 'homogeneity in the inner essence' was represented by the notes printed at full size; the 'variety in the outer appearance' would be relegated to small type. In focusing on shared features and hidden similarities in shape and contour, the tonal or harmonic significance of the various 'significant' notes in the themes would usually be ignored. So too would rhythm—with the result that Reti's method focuses on relatively abstract 'pitch cells' rather than rhythmically defined 'motifs'. In addition to admitting inversional and retrograde relationships between cells, Reti also introduced the process of 'interversion', in which the notes of a cell would be re-ordered.

Reti's analytical procedure is best understood concurrently to the work of other contemporary German analysts of the time such as Schenker and Schoenberg. Like Schenker, and Schoenberg, Reti's analysis of musical works was primarily motivic, tracing the evolution of a musical work from a melodic kernel. The preoccupation the three aforementioned theorists had with such procedure stems from a metaphysical belief that the works of the "great masters" (as exemplified in the First Viennese School) were unified thematically often, from a single idea. The metaphysical basis of this idea was that such unity, was thought to be a metaphor for the unity of God's creation. Thus in Reti's analysis the "thematic process" is explored, in Schenker the analysis takes the form of a reductionist procedure, and in Schoenberg the unity of a musical work from a "Grundgestalt" (basic shape) is asserted.

Reti's method, which is to be seen in the context of early-20th-century musicology, has been criticized by the music theorist Nicholas Cook, who regards Reti as having been over-concerned with proving the validity of his method, at the expense of producing convincing analyses of individual works.

== Writings ==
- 'Salzburg - Verheißung und Gefahr', 23. Eine Wiener Musikzeitschrift, Reprint, Nummer 15/16 (1935)
- The Thematic Process in Music (US 1951; UK 1961). ISBN 0-8371-9875-5.
- 'The Role of Duothematicism in the Evolution of Sonata Form', Music Review, Volume XVII Number 2 (1956)
- Tonality, Atonality, Pantonality: A study of some trends in twentieth century music (1958). ISBN 0-313-20478-0.
- Thematic Patterns in Sonatas of Beethoven (ed. Deryck Cooke; Faber, 1967)

== Bibliography ==
- Cook, Nicholas (1987), A Guide to Musical Analysis, Oxford: OUP
