= Five Pieces for Piano =

Set of piano pieces by Arnold Schoenberg

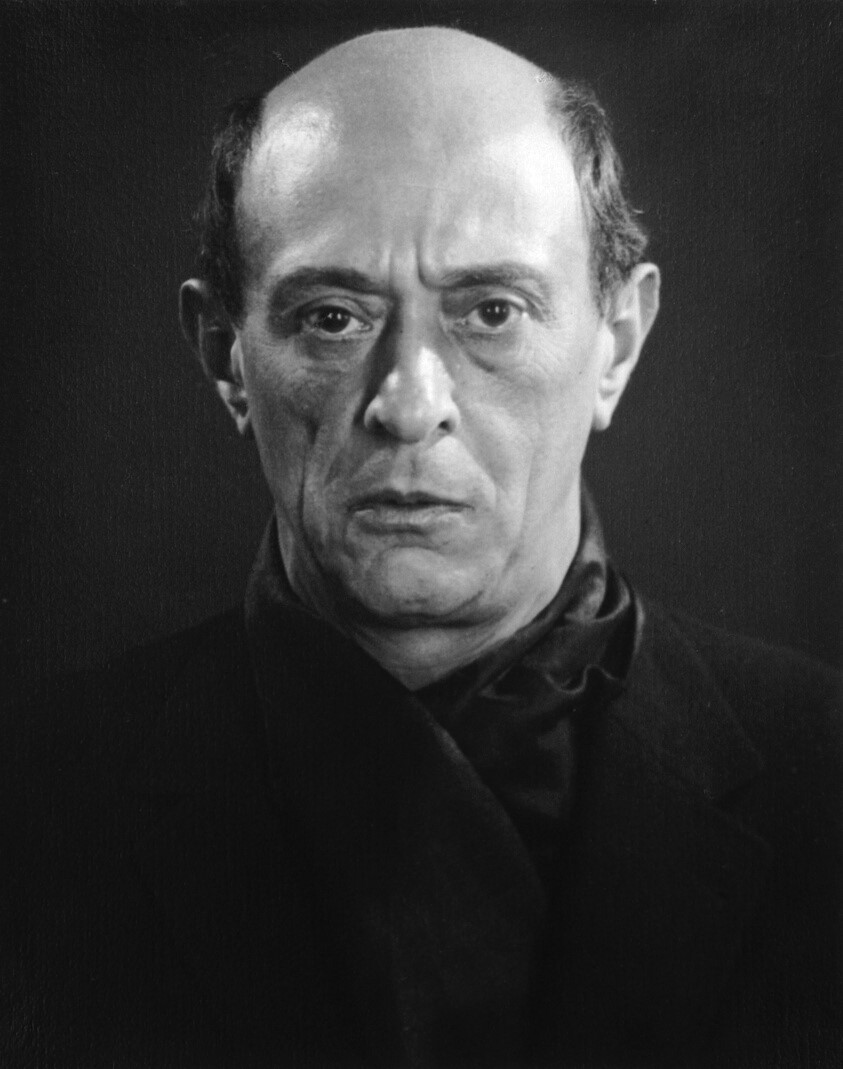
Arnold Schoenberg in 1927

Five Pieces for Piano, (German: Fünf Klavierstücke), Op. 23, is a set of five pieces for solo piano by Arnold Schoenberg, which he partly composed in 1920 and completed in 1923. The five pieces are:

1. Sehr langsam ("very slow")
2. Sehr rasch ("very fast")
3. Langsam ("slow")
4. Schwungvoll ("full of momentum")
5. Walzer ("waltz")

A typical performance of all five pieces takes around 12 minutes.

Each of the pieces explores a different approach to serializing pitch. The first piece simultaneously unfolds series of 21, 20, and 13 pitches, which later recur in the same order, but changed in rhythm and octave to generate a different, contrasting musical texture. Its initial impetus was a June 1920 solicitation from Henry Prunières, editor of the French music magazine "La Revue musicale," for contributions to a proposed "Tombeau de Claude Debussy," although Schoenberg ultimately decided not to submit it for inclusion in that project. The brief second piece, also written in 1920, is strongly contrasting. The third, composed in 1923, is based on a motive of five notes, and the fourth, started in 1920, then resumed in 1923, features four recurring pitch constellations. Piece number five, the waltz, uses a series of all twelve equal-tempered pitches, although with no transpositions or inversions. It is sometimes described as the first 12-tone work, but Schoenberg wrote it in February 1923, and he had previously composed portions of the entirely 12-tone Suite for Piano as early as 1921.

The Five Piano Pieces were first performed in their entirety in Autumn of 1923, in Hamburg, by Eduard Steuermann, who had also premiered the first two pieces in 1920, in Vienna.

They have been commercially recorded by pianists such as Glenn Gould, Claude Helffer, Paul Jacobs, Maurizio Pollini, Eduard Steuermann, and Peter Serkin.

Kathryn Bailey devoted a monograph to the Five Piano Pieces, "Composing with tones": A Musical Analysis of Schoenberg's Op. 23 Pieces for Piano (Royal Musical Association, London, 2001).
