= Drei Klavierstücke (Schoenberg) =

1909 composition by Arnold Schoenberg

- by Arnold Schoenberg
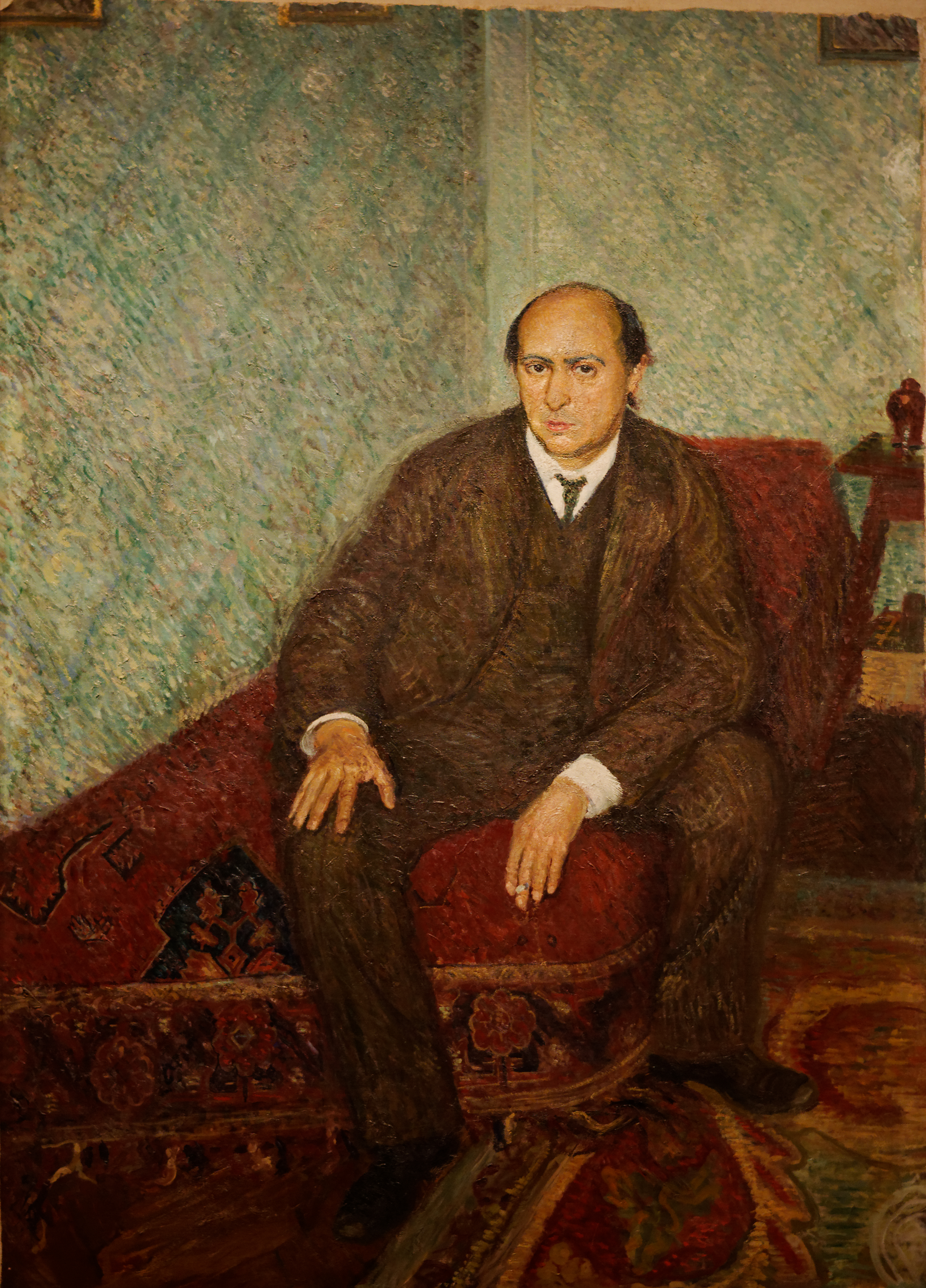
- Portrait of Arnold Schoenberg by Richard Gerstl, c. 1905
- English: Three Piano Pieces
- Opus: 11
- Style: Free atonality
- Composed: 1909
- Movements: Three

Drei Klavierstücke ("Three Piano Pieces"), Op. 11, is a set of pieces for solo piano written by the Austrian composer Arnold Schoenberg in 1909. They represent an early example of atonality in the composer's work.

== Music ==
2016 performance by Irakly Avaliani

The tempo markings of the three pieces are:

1. Mässige (at a moderate speed)
2. Mässige (very slowly)
3. Bewegte (with motion)

The first two pieces, dating from February 1909, are often cited as marking the point at which Schoenberg abandoned the last vestiges of traditional tonality, implying the language of common-practice harmony that had been inherent in Western music, in one way or another, for centuries. The functionality of this language, to Schoenberg at least, had by this time become stretched to bursting point in some of the more chromatically-saturated works of Wagner, Mahler, Richard Strauss and indeed some of Schoenberg's own earlier tonal works such as the string sextet Verklärte Nacht, Op. 4, of 1899.

Although there are vestigial, superficial remnants of tonal writing, such as lyrical melody, expressive appoggiaturas, and chordal accompaniment, tonal hearing, and tonal analysis are difficult to sustain. Nevertheless, at least three attempts at tonal analysis of the first piece have been made, by three respected authorities. One of them says it is in E, another says it is a prolongation of F♯ as the dominant of B, and the third concludes that it is in G. While all three are persuasive in their own way, other keys may also be heard here, but all are insubstantial. Any complete analysis must take these ghostly remnants of tonality into account, but no one key reliably shapes the structure. Atonal analyses of this first piece are also divided in opinion. Allen Forte describes its pitch organisation as "straightforward" and based on hexachords. George Perle is equally certain that it is constructed instead from three-note "intervallic cells".

The three pieces are given a unity of atonal musical space through the projection of material from the first piece into the other two, including recurring use of motivic material. The first of the three motivic cells of the first piece is used throughout the second, and the first and third cells are found in the third.

The third piece is the most innovative of the three. In its atomisation of the material and its agglomeration of the motivic cells through multiple connections, it isolates its musical parameters (mode of attack, rhythm, texture, register, and agogics) and employs them in a structural though unsystematic manner that foreshadows the integral serialism of the 1950s.

Characteristic of these pieces is a lack of motivic repetition or development and a rejection of traditional notions of balance and cadential, goal-oriented movement, supposedly deferring the musical discourse to a kind of stream-of-consciousness, or subjective, emotional expression. In likening these developments to contemporary styles in visual art (Schoenberg was himself a painter), notably Kandinsky's, with whom he had contact, the composer tellingly describes painting "without architecture ... an ever-changing, unbroken succession of colours, rhythms and moods".

The violence and suddenness of this emancipation from tradition was influenced by turbulent events in Schoenberg's life at the time: his wife Mathilde had recently eloped with the painter Richard Gerstl (who died by suicide when Mathilde returned to her husband), and in the professional sphere, his work was increasingly being met with hostility or incomprehension, as at the premiere of the Second String Quartet in 1908. However, Schoenberg at this time saw no contradiction in pursuing more seemingly traditional projects, such as the orchestration of his hyper-Wagnerian Gurre-Lieder (completed in 1911).

== Sources ==
- Benjamin, William (1984). "Harmony in Radical European Music, 1905–20", paper presented to the Society for Music Theory, 1984.
- Brinkmann, Reinhold (1969). Arnold Schönberg: Drei Klavierstücke Op. 11: Studien zur frühen Atonalität bei Schönberg. Supplement to the Archiv für Musikwissenschaft 7. Wiesbaden: Franz Steiner Verlag.
- Forte, Allen (Fall–Winter 1972). "Sets and Nonsets in Schoenberg's Atonal Music". Perspectives of New Music (Tenth anniversary issue). 11 (1): 43–64. doi:10.2307/832462. JSTOR 832462.
- MacDonald, Malcolm (2008). Schoenberg. Oxford and New York: Oxford University Press. ISBN 978-0-19-517201-0.
- Malhomme, Florence (1997). "Les Trois pièces pour piano op. 11 de Schoenberg: principes d'organisation de l'espace musical atonal". Musurgia (Dossiers d'analyse). 4 (1): 84–95. JSTOR 40591075.
- Ogdon, Will (1982). "How Tonality Functions in Schoenberg's Opus 11, No. 1." Journal of the Arnold Schoenberg Institute 5:169–181.
- Perle, George (1977). Serial Composition and Atonality, fourth edition, revised. Berkeley and Los Angeles: University of California Press.ISBN 0-520-03395-7.
- Straus, Joseph N. (2000). Introduction to Post-Tonal Theory, second edition. Upper Saddle River, New Jersey: Prentice Hall. ISBN 0-13-014331-6.
