= Audience reception =

Reception analysis

Also known as reception analysis, audience reception theory has come to be widely used as a way of characterizing the wave of audience research which occurred within communications and cultural studies during the 1980s and 1990s. On the whole, this work has adopted a "culturalist" perspective, has tended to use qualitative (and often ethnographic) methods of research and has tended to be concerned, one way or another, with exploring the active choices, uses and interpretations made of media materials, by their consumers. Can also be known as reception theory, in which producers encode with a desired response, then the audience decode.

== Origins ==
Audience reception theory can be traced back to work done by British Sociologist Stuart Hall and his communication model first revealed in an essay titled "Encoding/Decoding." Hall proposed a new model of mass communication which highlighted the importance of active interpretation within relevant codes. Hall's model of communication moved away from the view that the media had the power to directly cause a certain behavior in an individual, while at the same time holding onto the role of media as an agenda-setting function. Hall's model put forward three central premises: (1) the same event can be encoded in more than one way; (2) the message contains more than one possible reading; and (3) understanding the message can be a problematic process, regardless of how natural it may seem.

In "Encoding/Decoding", Hall addressed the issue of how people make sense of media texts, and presented three hypothetical methods of decoding. Hall often used examples involving televised media to explain his ideas. Hall argued that the dominant ideology is typically inscribed as the "preferred reading" in a media text, but that this is not automatically adopted by readers. The social situations of readers/viewers/listeners may lead them to adopt different stances."Dominant" readings are produced by those whose social situation favours the preferred reading; 'negotiated' readings are produced by those who inflect the preferred reading to take account of their social position; and "oppositional" readings are produced by those whose social position puts them into direct conflict with the preferred reading.

The encoding/decoding model invites analysts to categorize readings as "dominant", "negotiated" or "oppositional". This set of three presupposes that the media text itself is a vehicle of dominant ideology and that it hegemonically strives to get readers to accept the existing social order, with all its inequalities and oppression of underprivileged social groups.

Audience reception also has roots in uses and gratifications, structuralism, and post-structuralism.

== Encoding/decoding model ==
Since the early days of cultural studies-oriented interest in processes of audience meaning-making, the scholarly discussion about "readings" has leaned on two sets of polar opposites that have been invoked to explain the differences between the meaning supposedly encoded into and now residing in the media text and the meanings actualized by audiences from that text.

One framework of explanation has attempted to position readings on an ideological scale from "dominant" through "negotiated", to "oppositional", while another has relied on the semiotic notion of "polysemy", frequently without identifying or even mentioning its logical "other": the "monosemic" reading. Often these two frameworks have been used within the same argument, with no attempt made to distinguish "polysemic" from "oppositional" readings: in the literature one often encounters formulations which imply that if a TV programme triggers a diversity of meanings in different audience groups, this programme can then be called "polysemic", and the actualized meanings "oppositional".

== Audience analysis ==
Audiences can be groups or individuals targeted by and often built by media industries. Audience can be active (constantly filtering or resisting content) or passive (complying and vulnerable).

Audience analysis emphasizes the diversity of responses to a given popular culture artifact by examining as directly as possible how given audiences actually understand and use popular culture texts. Three kinds of research make up most audience research: (1) broad surveys and opinion polls (like the famous Nielsen ratings, but also those done by advertisers and by academic researchers) that cover a representative sample of many consumers. (2) small, representative focus groups brought in to react to and discuss a pop culture text. (3) in-depth ethnographic participant observation of a given audience, in which, for example, a researcher actually lives with and observes the TV viewing habits of a household over a substantial period of time, or travels on the road with a rock band. Each approach has strengths and weaknesses, and sometimes more than one approach is used as a check on the others. Audience analysis tries to isolate variables like region, race, ethnicity, age, gender, and income in an effort to see how different social groups tend to construct different meanings for the same text.

In media studies, there are two models used to construct audience reception. These models are defined as (1) The effects/hypodermic model and (2) the uses and gratification model. The effects model focuses on what the media does to audiences, influences is based on the message conveyed within the media. The uses and gratification model emphasizes what the audience does with the media presented to them, here influence lies with the consumer.

The "ethnographic turn" contributed to the maturing of the field as contexts of consumption are now recognized as having significant impact upon the processes of the interpretation of media. Sometimes characterized as the "active audience" approach, this paradigm has attracted criticism for the apparent jettisoning of the influence of cultural power, diminishing the authority of the text while elevating the influence of context. Nevertheless, developments in this vein have deepened our understanding of the significant relationship between media texts and the production of identity. Repeatedly, audience studies and fan studies have recorded the ways in which media texts are utilized and often re-made in the creative production and reproduction of self-identity.

== Reception theory ==
Reception theory emphasizes the reader's reception of a literary text or media. This approach to textual analysis focuses on the scope for negotiation and opposition on the part of the audience. This means that a "text"—be it a book, movie, or other creative work—is not simply passively accepted by the audience, but that the reader / viewer interprets the meanings of the text based on their individual cultural background and life experiences. In essence, the meaning of a text is not inherent within the text itself, but is created within the relationship between the text and the reader. A basic acceptance of the meaning of a specific text tends to occur when a group of readers have a shared cultural background and interpret the text in similar ways. It is likely that the less shared heritage a reader has with the artist, the less he/she will be able to recognize the artist's intended meaning, and it follows that if two readers have vastly different cultural and personal experiences, their reading of a text will vary greatly.
