= Sechs kleine Klavierstücke =

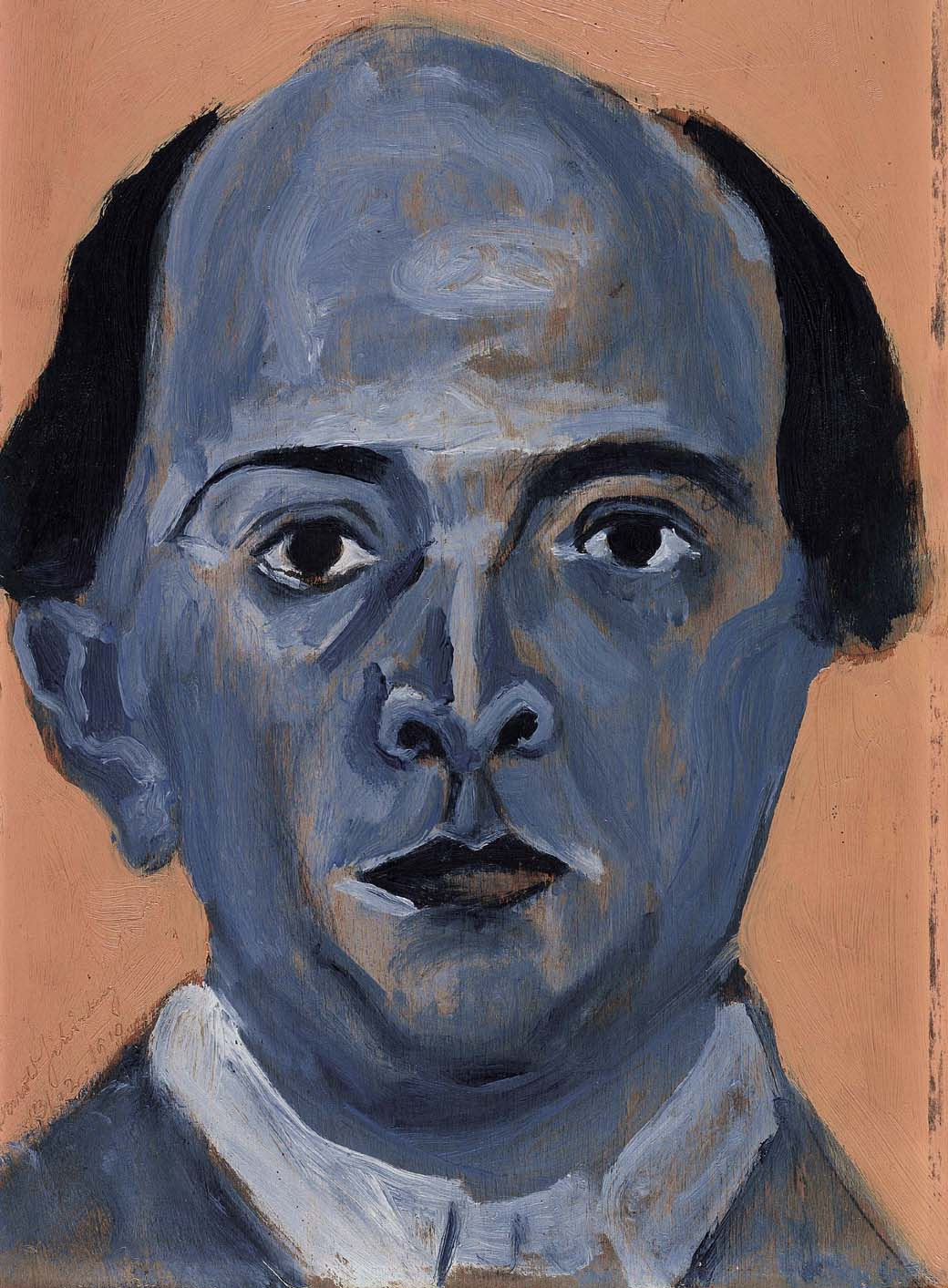
Arnold Schoenberg, self-portrait, 1910

Sechs kleine Klavierstücke, Op. 19 (Six Little Piano Pieces) is a set of pieces for solo piano written by the Austrian composer Arnold Schoenberg, published in 1913 at Universal Edition in Vienna.

== History ==
After having written large, dense works such as Pelleas und Melisande, up until 1907, Schönberg decided to turn away from this style, beginning with his second string quartet of 1908. The following excerpt, translated from a letter written to Ferruccio Busoni in 1909, well expresses his reaction against the excess of the Romantic period:

My goal: complete liberation from form and symbols, cohesion and logic. Away with motivic work! Away with harmony as the cement of my architecture! Harmony is expression and nothing more. Away with pathos! Away with 24 pound protracted scores! My music must be short. Lean! In two notes, not built, but "expressed". And the result is, I hope, without stylized and sterilized drawn-out sentiment. That is not how man feels; it is impossible to feel only one emotion. Man has many feelings, thousands at a time, and these feelings add up no more than apples and pears add up. Each goes its own way. This multicoloured, polymorphic, illogical nature of our feelings, and their associations, a rush of blood, reactions in our senses, in our nerves; I must have this in my music. It should be an expression of feeling, as if really were the feeling, full of unconscious connections, not some perception of "conscious logic". Now I have said it, and they may burn me.

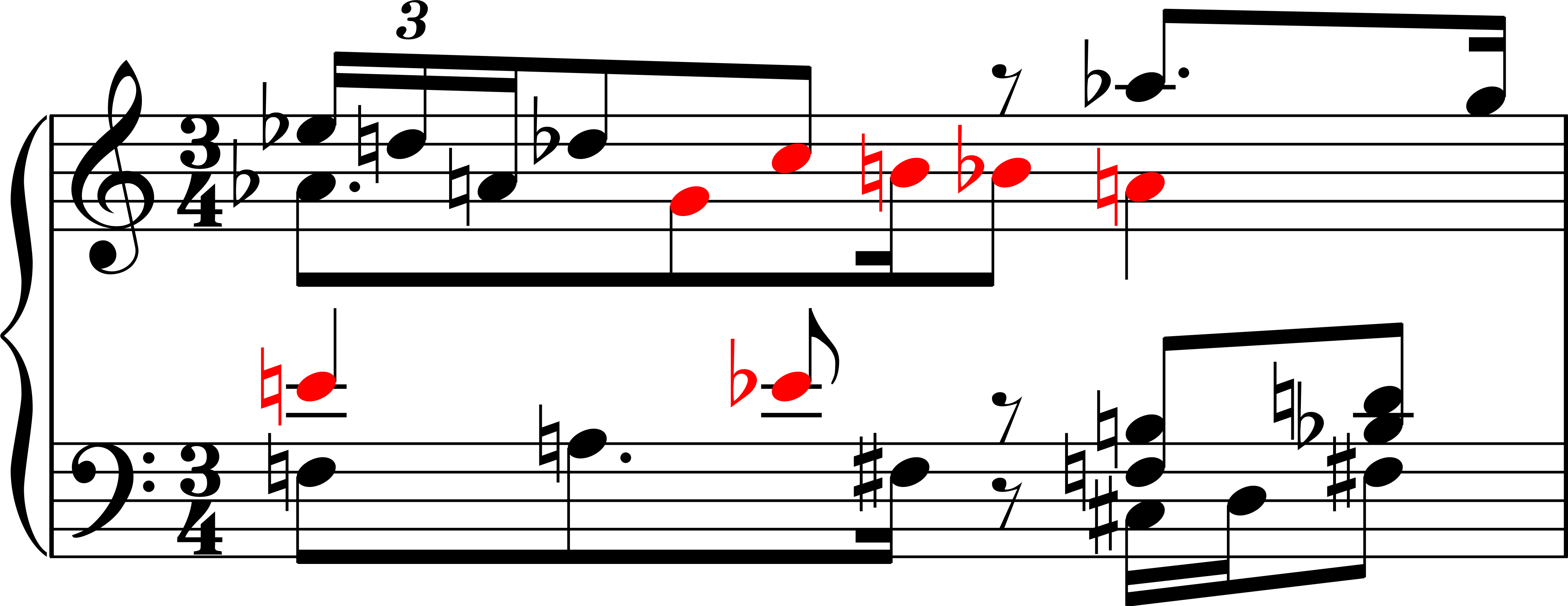
Musical cryptogram: "Aschbeg" set in Schoenberg's Sechs kleine Klavierstücke, Op. 19, no. 1, m. 5 Note that the notes (A/E♭/C/B/B♭/E/G) do not come in spelling order but are all adjacent (not separated by other notes).

This work was composed at the same time that Schoenberg was working on his orchestration of his massive Gurre-Lieder. While he maintained a lifelong love of Romantic music, the extreme contrast between his Klavierstücke and his more romantic works comes from his modernist desire to find a new means of expression. For him, works like the Gurre-Lieder or Verklärte Nacht fulfilled the tradition he loved, but it was works like these Klavierstücke, or the Fünf Orchesterstücke that attempted to reach beyond it.

The first five pieces were written in a single day, February 19, 1911, and were originally intended to comprise the entire piece. Schoenberg penned the sixth piece on June 17, shortly after the death of Gustav Mahler. Indeed, it is a, "well circulated claim that Schoenberg conceived op. 19/vi as a tombeau to Mahler". It was first performed on February 4, 1912, in Berlin, by Louis Closson.

The pieces have been arranged for a number of other instruments and ensembles. There is a guitar arrangement by Siegfried Behrend, and in 2006, Heinz Holliger arranged the pieces for instrumental ensemble, which he recorded with the Orchestre de Chambre de Lausanne.

== Structure ==
Sechs kleine Klavierstücke
MIDI rendition, 4:04

The six pieces do not carry individual names, but are often known by their tempo marking:

1. Leicht, zart (Light, delicate)
2. Langsam (Slow)
3. Sehr langsame (Very slow)
4. Rasch, aber leicht (Brisk, but light)
5. Etwas rasch (Somewhat brisk)
6. Sehr langsam (Very slow)

Each of the six pieces is aphoristically short, and unique in character. Following the expressionist aesthetic, each piece can be understood to be a long composition condensed into a single brief miniature. Schoenberg regarded this style of writing as a necessary compositional reaction to the diminishing power of tonality and this compositional style would be a huge influence on Schoenberg's pupil, Anton Webern, whose works are well known for their brevity. The work is commonly described as atonal, or at least any resemblance to tonality is fleeting, but it predates Schoenberg's later dodecaphonic development.
