= Zwei Klavierstücke (Schoenberg) =

- by Arnold Schoenberg
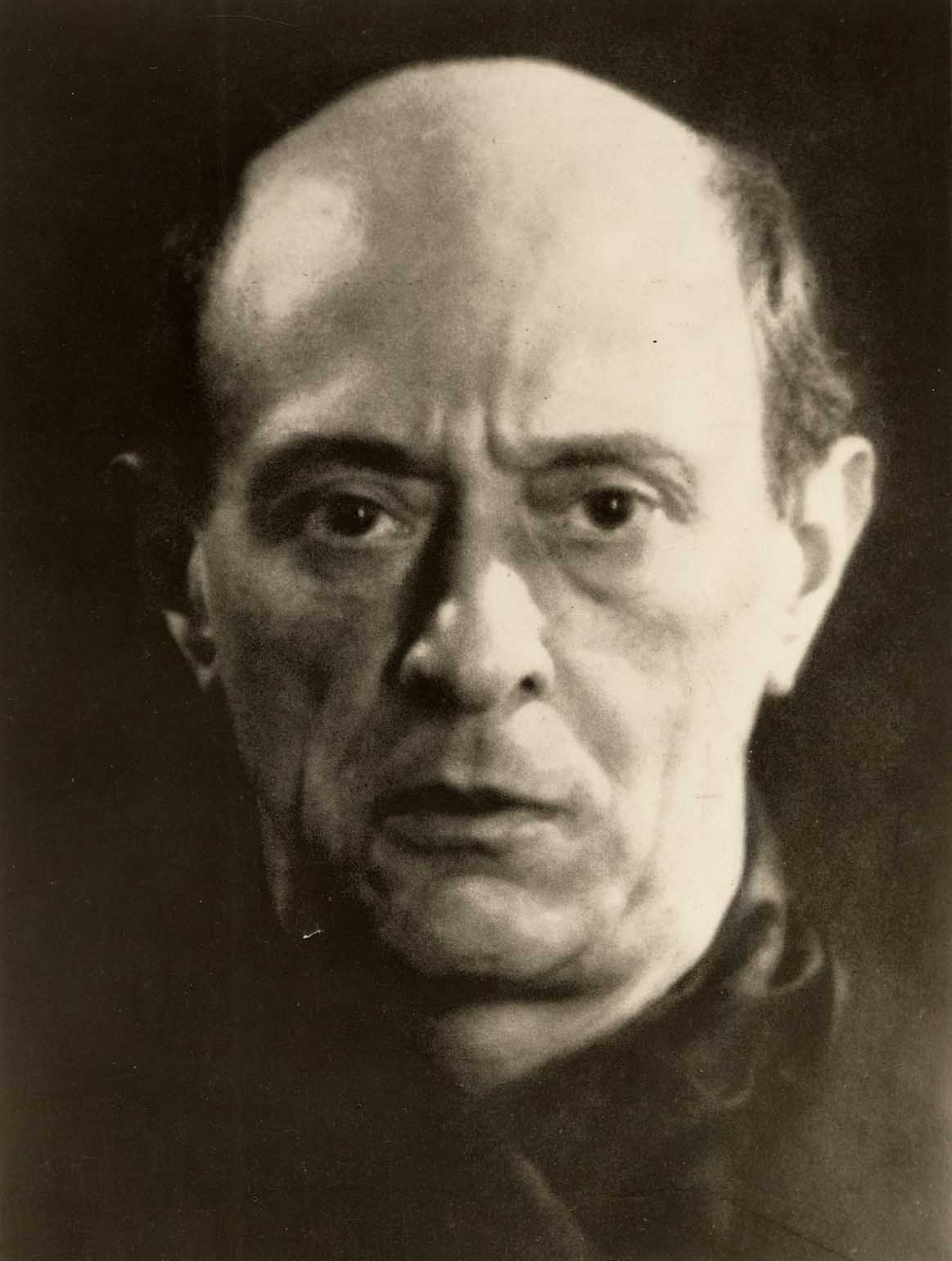
- Portrait of Arnold Schoenberg, 1927, by Man Ray
- English: Two Piano Pieces
- Opus: 33
- Genre: Contemporary music
- Composed: Op. 33a: 25 December 1928 – 25 April 1929: Op. 33b: 8 October 1931 – 10 October 1931:
- Performed: Op. 33a: 30 January 1931; Op. 33b: 11 January 1934
- Published: Op. 33a: July 1929: Vienna; Op. 33b: April 1932: San Francisco
- Movements: 2
- Scoring: Piano

Zwei Klavierstücke, Op. 33, also known as Zwei Stücke, or in English as Two Piano Pieces and Two Pieces, is a composition for piano by Austrian composer Arnold Schoenberg. They were composed between 1928 and 1931 and were Schoenberg's last works for solo piano.

== Composition ==
Schoenberg's Piano Pieces were just some of his smaller compositions that followed Von heute auf morgen and Moses und Aron. He started composing the first, Op. 33a, when the director of Universal Edition contacted him to publish the first piece in Op. 11 in an anthology of piano compositions. Schoenberg then decided to write a new piece on December 25, 1928, and finished it on April 25, 1929. The composition of the second piece, however, took only three days, from October 8 to 10, 1931, while he was staying in Barcelona. The impetus for Op. 33b was a request by Schoenberg's former pupil Adolph Weiss for a new piano piece that Henry Cowell's New Music Quarterly could publish as Op. 33b. Thus, Op. 33a and b were composed separately, but it is still unknown if Schoenberg had conceived them to comprise a unified composition.

Both pieces were also premiered separately. The first piece was published by Universal Edition in July, 1929, and premiered in Berlin, on January 30, 1931, by Else C. Klaus. The second piece was published by The New Music Society of California Publisher, in April, 1932, and premiered in San Francisco's New Music Society on January 11, 1934, by Douglas Thompson. Since then, it has also been published by Belmont Music Publishers and by Schott Music.

== Analysis ==
The two movements of this composition show the development of Schoenberg's twelve-tone technique, from its initial conception until its culmination in 1936. It takes approximately five minutes to perform both movements, and neither movement has a title. In some recordings, the movements are titled according to their tempo markings:

1. Mässig
2. Mässig langsam

Both movements follow the principles of the twelve-tone technique, according to which a row of twelve tones is selected in order to construct the composition. The row of Op. 33a is 0 7 2 1 11 8 3 5 9 10 4 6.

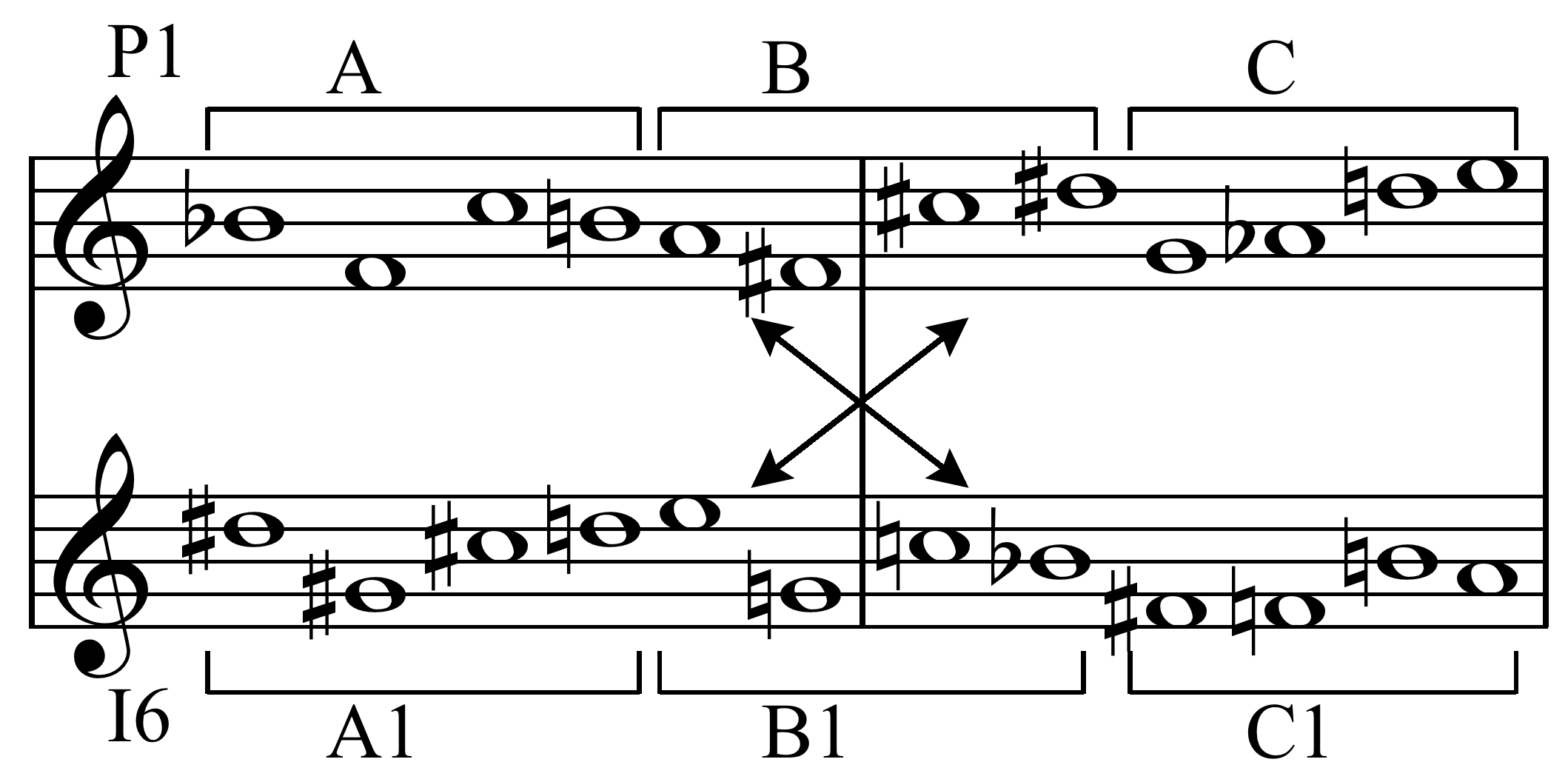

In order to compose the piece, Schoenberg uses inverted and retrograde versions of the row in various forms. The first movement starts with six chords, which show the row used in the piece.

== Arrangements ==
Takatoshi Naitoh arranged this composition for computer and synthesizer in 1991. It was recorded at the Polydor KK Studio in Tokyo, in June, 1991, and was released by Deutsche Grammophon in Japan.
