= The Book of the Hanging Gardens =

Song cycle by Arnold Schoenberg on poems by Stefan George

- by Arnold Schoenberg
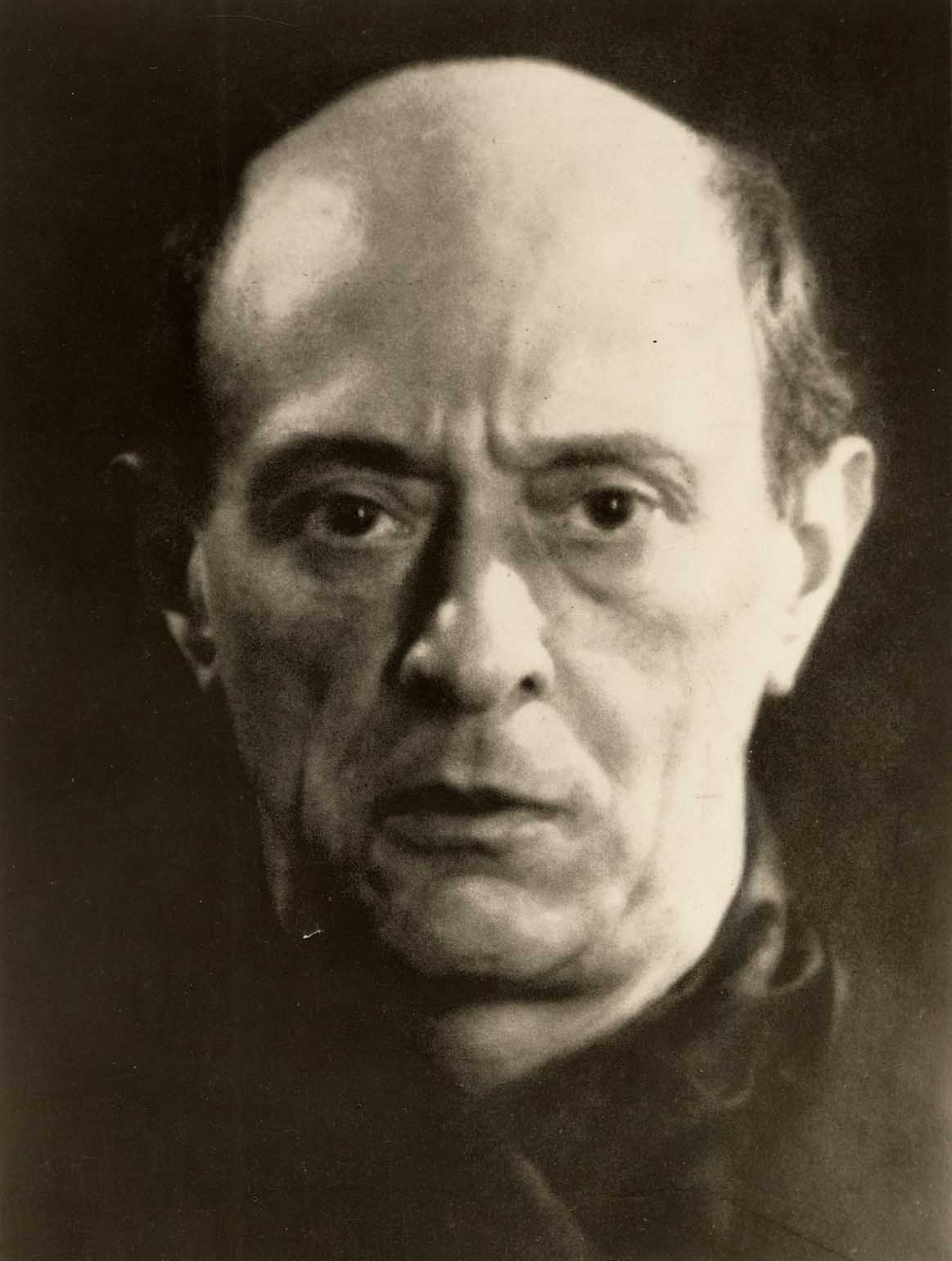
- Portrait of Arnold Schoenberg by Man Ray, 1927
- Native name: Das Buch der hängenden Gärten
- Opus: 15
- Genre: Song cycle
- Style: Free atonality
- Text: The Book of the Hanging Gardens by Stefan George
- Language: German
- Composed: 1908–1909
- Duration: about 30 minutes
- Movements: 15 songs
- Scoring: Soprano and piano

Premiere
- Date: 14 January 1910
- Location: Vienna
- Performers: Martha Winternitz-Dorda (soprano); Etta Werndorf (piano)

The Book of the Hanging Gardens (German: Das Buch der hängenden Gärten), Op. 15, is a fifteen-part song cycle composed by Arnold Schoenberg between 1908 and 1909, setting poems of Stefan George. George's poems, also under the same title, track the failed love affair of two adolescent youths in a garden, ending with the woman's departure and the disintegration of the garden. The song cycle is set for solo voice and piano. The Book of the Hanging Gardens breaks away from conventional musical order through its usage of atonality.

The piece was premiered by Austrian singer Martha Winternitz-Dorda and pianist Etta Werndorf on January 14, 1910, in Vienna.

== Background ==
The Book of the Hanging Gardens served as the start to the atonal period in Schoenberg's music. Atonal compositions, referred to as "pantonal" by Schoenberg, typically contain features such as a lack of central tonality, pervading harmonic dissonance rather than consonance, and a general absence of traditional melodic progressions. This period of atonality became commonly associated with the expressionist movement, despite the fact that Schoenberg rarely referred to the term "expressionism" in his writings. Whether or not he wanted to be associated with the movement, Schoenberg expresses an unambiguous positivity with his discovery of this new style in a program note for the 1910 first performance of The Book of the Hanging Gardens:

With the [Stefan] George songs I have for the first time succeeded in approaching an ideal of expression and form which has been in my mind for many years. Until now I lacked the strength and confidence to make it a reality. I am being forced in this direction ... not because my invention or technique is inadequate, but [because] I am obeying an inner compulsion, which is stronger than any upbringing. I am obeying the formative process which, being the one natural to me, is stronger than my artistic education.

Schoenberg's libretto transcends the tragic love poems of George and becomes a deeper reflection of Schoenberg's mood during this period when viewing his personal life. The poems tell of a love affair gone awry without explicitly stating the cause of its demise. In 1908, Schoenberg's wife Mathilde left him and their two children for Richard Gerstl, a painter with whom Schoenberg was a close friend and for whom Mathilde often modeled. She returned to the family from her flight with Gerstl eventually, but not before Schoenberg discovered the poems of George and began drawing inspiration from them.

== Content ==
Hanging Gardens closely relates music and text, with harmony, texture, tempo, and declamation conveying mood and textual meaning. Though time seems to pass as in a narrative, there is an overall sense of languid stasis. Intervallic cells can be heard as symbolizing hoped-for love and unfulfilled longing, and the opening three-against-four rhythm recurs throughout.

Although the 15 poems do not necessarily describe a story or follow a linear development, the general subjects can be grouped as follows: a description of the paradise (poems 1 and 2), the paths that the lover takes to reach his beloved (poems 3–5), his passions (poems 6–9), the peak of the time together (poems 10–13), premonition (poem 14), and finally, love dies away and Eden is no more (poem 15).

	First line of each poem (Original German)	Approximate English translation
1	Unterm Schutz von dichten Blättergründen	Under the shade of thick leaves
2	Hain in diesen Paradiesen	Groves in this paradise
3	Als Neuling trat ich ein in dein Gehege	As a novice, I entered your enclosure
4	Da meine Lippen reglos sind und brennen	Because my lips are motionless and burning
5	Saget mir auf welchem Pfade	Tell me on which paths
6	Jedem Werke bin ich fürder tot	To everything else I am henceforth dead
7	Angst und Hoffen wechselnd sich beklemmen	Fear and hope alternately oppress me
8	Wenn ich heut nicht deinen Leib berühre	If I today do not touch your body
9	Streng ist uns das Glück und spröde	Stern is our happiness, and delicate
10	Das schöne Beet betracht ich mir im Harren	I looked at the beautiful flowerbed while waiting
11	Als wir hinter dem beblümten Tore	As we behind the flowered gates
12	Wenn sich bei heilger Ruh in tiefen Matten	When in holy rest in deep meadows
13	Du lehnest wider eine Silberweide	You lean against a white willow
14	Sprich nicht mehr von dem Laub	Say no more of the foliage
15	Wir bevölkerten die abend-düstern Lauben	We occupied the night-gloomy arcades

== Reception ==
Upon its premiere in 1910, The Book of the Hanging Gardens was not critically acclaimed or accepted in mainstream culture. Its harmonies were disdained. Although Hanging Gardens and other Schoenberg works had been played in Paris since 1910, there was little French coverage of Schoenberg's music, and reviews elsewhere were usually scathing: in 1913, James Huneker called Schoenberg a "musical anarchist who upset all of Europe" in The New York Times.

By the 1920s, Hanging Gardens and atonal music in general found more acceptance in France, where musical progressives viewed Schoenberg as an important, legitimate composer of expressive music.

Later, Carl Schorske interpreted the disintegration of George's garden as symbolizing the breakdown of traditional order, a cultural shift paralleled in Schoenberg's own departure from musical tradition.

== See also ==
- Das Marienleben – Song cycle by Paul Hindemith
- Leitmotif – Short, constantly recurring musical phrase
- Motif (music) – Short recurring musical phrase
