= Reinhold Brinkmann =

German musicologist (1934–2010)

Reinhold Brinkmann (21 August 1934, Wildeshausen, Oldenburg, Lower Saxony – 10 October 2010, Eckernförde, Rendsburg-Eckernförde, Schleswig-Holstein) was a German musicologist.

Brinkmann was born in Wildeshausen and studied at Freiburg im Breisgau. His dissertation was about Arnold Schönberg's Klavierstücke op. 11. He started working on the faculty of Freie Universität Berlin in 1970. From 1972 to 1980 he taught at Philipps-Universität Marburg, and then until 1985 again in Berlin, at the Universität der Künste Berlin. After 1985 he taught at Harvard University, as the James Edward Ditson professor, and chair of the department of music. In 2001 he was honored with the Ernst von Siemens Music Prize. In 2006 he was elected Honorary Member of the American Musicological Society.

His research has included widely diverse publications in all areas of music theory and history from the 18th to the 20th centuries, with particular emphasis on interdisciplinary aspects. His writings examined subjects such as the Second Viennese School (especially Arnold Schoenberg), the Romantic Lied tradition, Richard Wagner, Alexander Scriabin, Edgard Varèse, Hanns Eisler, and Charles Ives. His last, unfinished project, which drew Brinkmann back to Berlin, according to the Süddeutsche Zeitung, had the working title "Das verzerrte Sublime: eine Analyse des Umgangs mit der großen musikalischen Überlieferung im Dritten Reich."

== Selected writings ==
- Richard Wagner: Von der Oper zum Musikdrama. Bern: Francke 1978.
- (ed.) Improvisation und neue Musik. 8 Kongressreferate. Mainz: Schott 1979.
- (ed.) Musik im Alltag. 10 Kongressbeiträge. Mainz: Schott 1980.
- Late Idyll: The Second Symphony of Johannes Brahms, translated by Peter Palmer, Harvard University Press, 1997.
- Arnold Schönberg: Drei Klavierstücke Op. 11. Studien zur frühen Atonalität bei Schönberg. 2., durchges. Aufl. mit einem neuen Vorwort. Stuttgart: Steiner 2000.
- "Musik nachdenken." Reinhold Brinkmann und Wolfgang Rihm im Gespräch. Regensburg: ConBrio 2001.
- Music of My Future: The Schoenberg Quartets and Trio, edited by Reinhold Brinkmann and Christoph Wolff, Harvard University Press, 2001.
- Vom Pfeifen und von alten Dampfmaschinen. Aufsätze zur Musik von Beethoven bis Rihm. Wien: Zsolnay 2006.
