= String Quartets (Schoenberg) =

Series of string quartets composed by Arnold Schoenberg

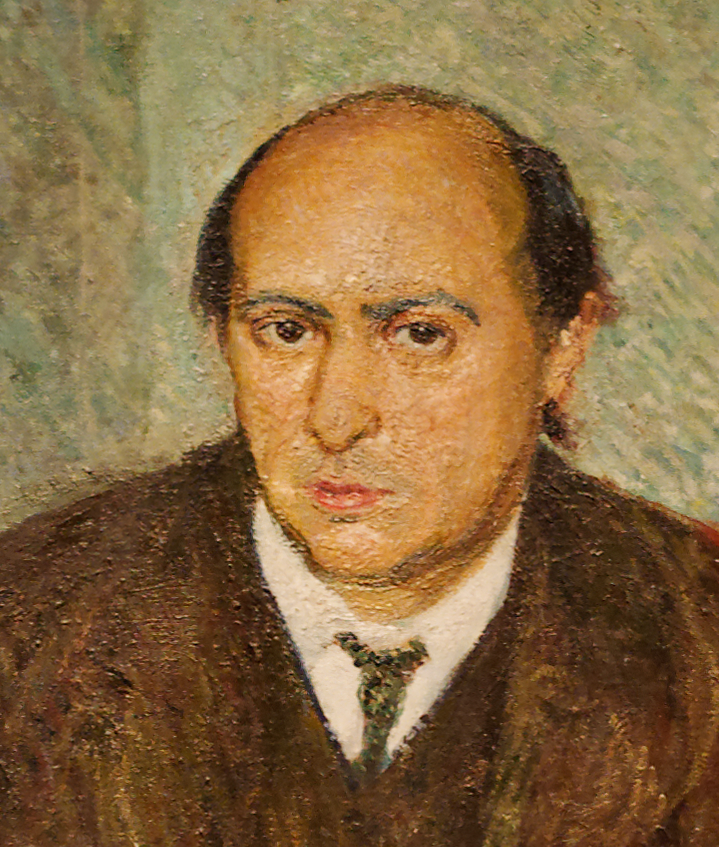
Portrait of Arnold Schoenberg by Richard Gerstl, 1905

The Austrian composer Arnold Schoenberg published four string quartets, distributed over his lifetime: String Quartet No. 1 in D minor, Opus 7 (1905), String Quartet No. 2 in F♯ minor, Op. 10 (1908), String Quartet No. 3, Op. 30 (1927), and the String Quartet No. 4, Op. 37 (1936).

In addition to these, he wrote several other works for string quartet which were not published. The most notable was his early String Quartet in D major (1897). There was also a Presto in C major (c. 1895), a Scherzo in F major (1897), and later a Four-part Mirror Canon in A major (c. 1933). Finally, several string quartets exist in fragmentary form. These include String Quartet in F major (before 1897), String Quartet in D minor (1904), String Quartet in C major (after 1904), String Quartet Movement (1926), String Quartet (1926), String Quartet in C major (after 1927) and String Quartet No. 5 (1949).

Schoenberg also wrote a Concerto for String Quartet and Orchestra in B♭ major (1933): a recomposition of a work by the Baroque composer George Frideric Handel.

== String Quartet in D major ==
This string quartet in four movements is Schoenberg's earliest extant work of large scale: average duration of recorded performances is about 27 minutes. Completed in 1897, it was premiered privately on March 17, 1898, and publicly later that same year on December 20 in Vienna. It was published posthumously in 1966 (Faber Music, London).

Schoenberg's friend Alexander von Zemlinsky gave him much advice and criticism during the composition of this work. Zemlinsky even showed an early draft of it to Johannes Brahms, whom Schoenberg very much admired. It was given the old master's approval.

The string quartet is in four movements:

1. Allegro molto
2. Intermezzo (Andantino grazioso)
3. Theme and Variations (Andante con moto)
4. Allegro

The original second movement was the Scherzo in F which now exists as a separate piece. Schoenberg substituted the Intermezzo at Zemlinsky's suggestion.

== String Quartet No. 1, Op. 7 ==
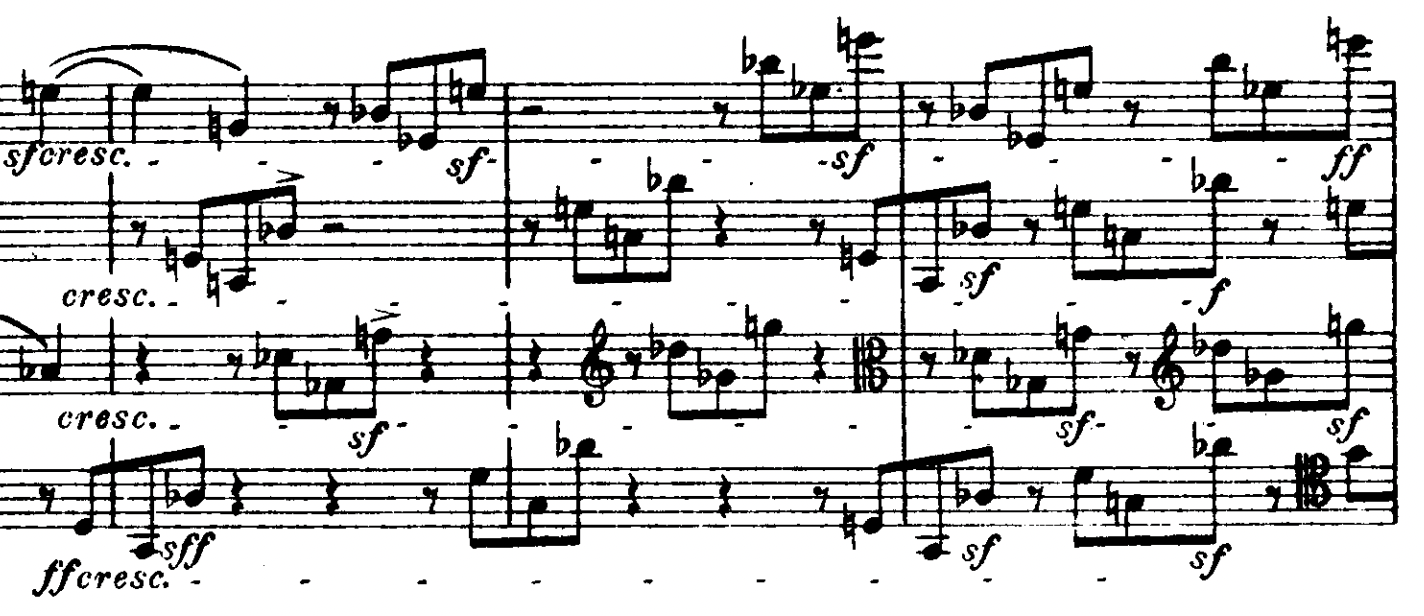
Measures 41–4 from section C of Schoenberg's String Quartet No. 1

A large work consisting of one movement which lasts longer than 45 minutes, Schoenberg's First String Quartet established his reputation as a composer. Begun in the summer of 1904 and completed in September 1905, the quartet is remarkable for its density of its orchestration.

The quartet is in D minor. The tonality is stretched to the limit as was common in late Romantic music. It also carries a small collection of themes which appear repeatedly in many guises. Instead of balanced phrase structures typical of string quartet writing up to that period, Schoenberg wrote asymmetrical phrases that build into larger cohesive groups.

According to Schoenberg, when he showed the score to Gustav Mahler, the composer exclaimed: "I have conducted the most difficult scores of Wagner; I have written complicated music myself in scores of up to thirty staves and more; yet here is a score of not more than four staves, and I am unable to read them."

== String Quartet No. 2, Op. 10 ==
String Quartet No. 2, movement 4
Performed by the Carmel Quartet, with soprano Rona Israel-Kolatt, in 2007

This work in four movements was written during a very emotional time in Schoenberg's life. Though it bears the dedication "to my wife", it was written during Mathilde Schoenberg's affair with their friend and neighbour, artist Richard Gerstl, in 1908. It was first performed by the Rosé Quartet and the soprano Marie Gutheil-Schoder.

The second movement quotes the Viennese folk song, "O du lieber Augustin". As musical settings of Stefan George's poetry, the third and fourth movements feature a soprano; a 1914 Vossische Zeitung critic called this innovation in genre Beethovenian (alluding to the Symphony No. 9, a choral symphony).

On setting George, Schoenberg later wrote, "I was inspired by [his] poems ... and, surprisingly, without any expectation on my part, these songs showed a style quite different from everything I had written before. ... New sounds were produced, a new kind of melody appeared, a new approach to expression of moods and characters was discovered."

The string quartet is in four movements:

1. Mäßig (Moderate), F♯ minor
2. Sehr rasch (Very brisk), D minor
3. "Litanei", langsam ("Litany", slow), E♭ minor, though from a Schenkerian perspective, "in spite of the decisive bass reading, the upper voice fails to unfold a fundamental line from the structural " or G♭ major
4. "Entrückung", sehr langsam ("Rapture", very slow)

=== Text ===
The latter two movements of the Second String Quartet are set to poems from Stefan George's collection Der siebente Ring (The Seventh Ring), which was published in 1907.

Litanei
Tief ist die trauer die mich umdüstert,
Ein tret ich wieder, Herr! in dein haus.

Lang war die reise, matt sind die glieder,
Leer sind die schreine, voll nur die qual.

Durstende zunge darbt nach dem weine.
Hart war gestritten, starr ist mein arm.

Gönne die ruhe schwankenden schritten,
Hungrigem gaume bröckle dein brot!

Schwach ist mein atem rufend dem traume,
Hohl sind die hände, fiebernd der mund.

Leih deine kühle, lösche die brände.
Tilge das hoffen, sende das licht!

Gluten im herzen lodern noch offen,
Innerst im grunde wacht noch ein schrei.

Töte das sehnen, schliesse die wunde!
Nimm mir die liebe, gib mir dein glück!

Litany
Deep is the sadness that gloomily comes over me,
Again I step, Lord, in your house.

Long was the journey, my limbs are weary,
The shrines are empty, only anguish is full.

My thirsty tongue desires wine.
The battle was hard, my arm is stiff.

Grudge peace to my staggering steps,
for my hungry gums break your bread!

Weak is my breath, calling the dream,
my hands are hollow, my mouth fevers.

Lend your coolness, douse the fires,
rub out hope, send the light!

Still active flames are glowing inside my heart;
in my deepest insides a cry awakens.

Kill the longing, close the wound!
Take love away from me, and give me your happiness!

Entrückung
Ich fühle luft von anderem planeten.
Mir blassen durch das dunkel die gesichter
Die freundlich eben noch sich zu mir drehten.

Und bäum und wege die ich liebte fahlen
Dass ich sie kaum mehr kenne und du lichter
Geliebter schatten—rufer meiner qualen—

Bist nun erloschen ganz in tiefern gluten
Um nach dem taumel streitenden getobes
Mit einem frommen schauer anzumuten.

Ich löse mich in tönen, kreisend, webend,
Ungründigen danks und unbenamten lobes
Dem grossen atem wunschlos mich ergebend.

Mich überfährt ein ungestümes wehen
Im rausch der weihe wo inbrünstige schreie
In staub geworfner beterinnen flehen:

Dann seh ich wie sich duftige nebel lüpfen
In einer sonnerfüllten klaren freie
Die nur umfängt auf fernsten bergesschlüpfen.

Der boden schüffert weiss und weich wie molke.
Ich steige über schluchten ungeheuer.
Ich fühle wie ich über letzter wolke

In einem meer kristallnen glanzes schwimme—
Ich bin ein funke nur vom heiligen feuer
Ich bin ein dröhnen nur der heiligen stimme.

Rapture
I feel air from another planet.
The faces that once turned to me in friendship
Pale in the darkness before me.

And trees and paths that I once loved fade away
So that I scarcely recognize them, and you bright
Beloved shadow—summoner of my anguish—

Are now extinguished completely in deeper flames
In order, after the frenzy of warring confusion,
To reappear in a pious display of awe.

I lose myself in tones, circling, weaving,
With unfathomable thanks and unnamable praise;
Bereft of desire, I surrender myself to the great breath.

A tempestuous wind overwhelms me
In the ecstasy of consecration where the fervent cries
Of women praying in the dust implore:

Then I see a filmy mist rising
In a sun-filled, open expanse
That includes only the farthest mountain retreats.

The land looks white and smooth like whey.
I climb over enormous ravines.
I feel like I am swimming above the furthest cloud

In a sea of crystal radiance—
I am only a spark of the holy fire
I am only a whisper of the holy voice.

== String Quartet No. 3, Op. 30 ==
Schoenberg's Third String Quartet dates from 1927, after he had worked out the basic principles of his twelve-tone technique. Schoenberg had followed the "fundamental classicistic procedure" by modeling this work on Schubert's String Quartet in A minor, Op. 29, without intending in any way to recall Schubert's composition. There is evidence that Schoenberg regarded his 12-tone sets—independent of rhythm and register—as motivic in the commonly understood sense, and this has been demonstrated with particular reference to the second movement of this quartet.

Arts patron Elizabeth Sprague Coolidge, whose foundation materials are held at the Library of Congress, commissioned the Quartet, Op. 30 on March 2, 1927. The work had already been completed by this time, and its première was given in Vienna on September 19, 1927, by the Kolisch Quartet.

The string quartet is in four movements:

1. Moderato
2. Theme and Variations (Adagio)
3. Intermezzo (Allegro moderato)
4. Rondo (Molto moderato)

== String Quartet No. 4, Op. 37 ==
Schoenberg's Fourth String Quartet (April–June 1936, commissioned by Coolidge) marks his transition to a late style. It is freer than the Third, and he called it "much more pleasant". After sketches, he wrote the Quartet in six weeks for $1,000. The Kolisch Quartet premiered it in Los Angeles in 1937, and Schoenberg dedicated it to them and Coolidge.

The Quartet has four motivically linked movements with the same twelve-tone row. The first, marked Allegro molto, energico (lit. 'Very fast, energetic'), is a march in an abstract sonata form veiled by extensive thematic variation. The second, marked Comodo (lit. 'Leisurely'), is an intermezzo in ternary form. The solemn third, marked Largo (lit. 'Broadly', as in very slowly and expansively), is in binary form (ABAB). The finale, marked Allegro (lit. 'Fast'), is a rondo dominated by variation.
