= Herzgewächse =

Lied by Arnold Schoenberg

- Lied by Arnold Schoenberg
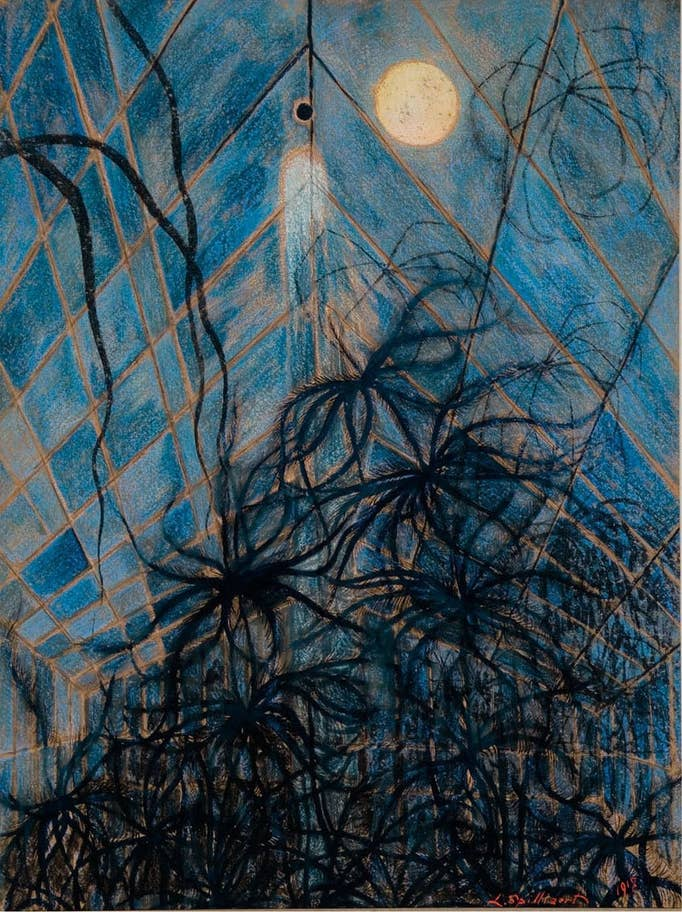
- Léon Spilliaert's 1917 illustration of Maeterlinck's poem
- Opus: 20
- Text: "Feuillage du cœur" (Maurice Maeterlinck, in an altered German translation)
- Composed: 1911
- Published: 1912 (Der Blaue Reiter)
- Scoring: high soprano; celesta; harmonium; harp

Premiere
- Date: 30 March 1922
- Location: Paris

Herzgewächse (Heart's Foliage, or Foliage of the Heart), Op. 20, is a brief Lied (German art song) that Austrian (and later American) composer Arnold Schoenberg finished in late 1911 in Berlin, during his atonal period. Using the translation by Karl Anton Klammer and Friedrich von Oppeln-Bronikowski, which he modified, Schoenberg set Maurice Maeterlinck's poem "Feuillage du cœur" to music for high soprano, celesta, harmonium, and harp. The art song exemplifies Schoenberg's structurally innovative, modernist harmonic language and expressive word painting.

The music evokes the poem's imagery of light and color playing on botanical forms inside a greenhouse, rendered as symbols of inner feelings. It employs rhythmic patterns, varied textures, ethereal timbres, and delicate, interlocking motives built from trichords and interval cycles. The virtuosic soprano melody, ranging G♯_{3}–F_{6}, is a musical metaphor for the Symbolist poem's narrative as centered on a moonlit lily, from its isolation among dark, entangled foliage and merely ornamental blooms to its spiritual ascent within the blue-glass enclosure. Scholars have suggested links to Richard Wagner's Tristan und Isolde and its study, the third Wesendonck Lied.

Wassily Kandinsky and Franz Marc included a facsimile of the music manuscript in Der Blaue Reiter Almanach (1912). In his essay "The Relationship to the Text", which was also included, Schoenberg described his approach to the musical setting as a flow of ideas. At its planned 1912 Berlin premiere, Martha Winternitz-Dorda decided late not to sing Herzgewächse, likely due to its difficulty. She was also asked to sing it in Vienna, but this did not happen either. Universal Edition obtained a music engraving of Herzgewächse in 1914. Eventually, after World War I and amid economic instability, they published it in 1920.

Jean Wiéner organized its 1922 world premiere in Paris, and Eva Leoni sang its 1923 United States premiere to great acclaim with the International Composers Guild in New York City. Neue Musik (lit. 'New Music') enthusiasts in Freiburg im Bresgau gave Herzgewächse its apparent 1925 German premiere. Marianne Rau-Hoeglauer sang its 1928 Austrian premiere, conducted by Anton Webern. In 1945 post-World War II Paris, Combat promoted Lucienne Tragin singing Herzgewächse with René Leibowitz conducting and Pierre Boulez, who the song likely influenced, on harmonium. In early 1950s Los Angeles, Marni Nixon sang it twice, giving encores both times, and local radio aired one performance live. She and Robert Craft first recorded Herzgewächse in 1954, and many other musicians' recordings followed.

== Composition ==
=== Background ===
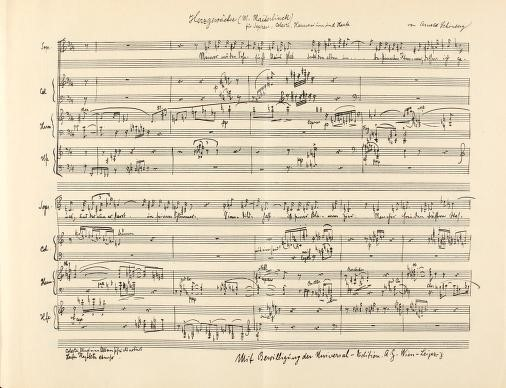
Herzgewächse was first published as a facsimile manuscript in Der Blaue Reiter.

After his second move to Berlin, Schoenberg composed Herzgewächse with speed characteristic especially of his atonal period, completing it on 9 December 1911 for facsimile publication in the 1912 almanac Der Blaue Reiter, edited by Wassily Kandinsky and Franz Marc.

Kandinsky, who linked sound and color, asked Schoenberg, Alban Berg, and Webern to send their work. Berg sent "Warm die Lüfte", Op. 2/iv. Webern sent "Ihr tratet zu dem Herde", Op. 4/v, in what became only his second publication after some rejections. Schoenberg sent paintings, Herzgewächse, and "Das Verhältnis zum Text" ("The Relationship to the Text"), his essay describing the Lied as shaped by poetic inspiration and composed in a state of "ecstasy".

Scholars like Bryan R. Simms emphasize a stream-of-consciousness approach to musical form in Schoenberg's works of this period, with atomization of material, or musical ideas, into a kind of athematicism.

=== Song ===
At three and a half minutes, Herzgewächse is Schoenberg's shortest opus. The celesta and harp rest more than the harmonium, which uses stops to alter its timbre throughout.

The music is generally polyphonic and saturated motivically with cells. These include many trichords, especially [0,1,4], sometimes interpolated with other sets, including cyclic sets. These cells are varied by continuous transformation as distinct figures. The voice leading yields quasi-tonal or tertian harmonies and fragments of cyclic harmonic progressions, often by melodic implication.

For example, this fragment is presented mostly as consecutive thirds. It unfolds as though in two voices. One voice repeats a kind of common tone parsimoniously as the other descends, followed by a voice exchange.

==== Opening ====
The opening phrase of music begins on the harmonium with an A–C–G♯ sonority, a particular [0,1,4] trichord, soon joined by the harp. This phrase contains two segments:

- First, a dense texture using the harmonium's clarinet stop (anacrusis and m. 1).
- Second, a rising melody using the harmonium's flute stop (mm. 2–3).

This foreshadows the poem's two-part narrative (stanzas 1–2 and 3–4). It also anticipates the song's roughly binary form (mm. 1–15 and 16–30, notwithstanding subsections).

==== Poem, translation, and narrative ====
Maurice Maeterlinck's poem was rendered as "Herzgewächse" in German translation.

The soprano sings Maurice Maeterlinck's "Feuillage du cœur", a poem from the collection Serres chaudes (1889; English: Hothouses, or Hothouse Blooms) in the 1906 German translation of Karl Anton Klammer (pseudonym K. L. Ammer) and Friedrich von Oppeln-Bronikowski.

A Symbolist meditation, Maeterlinck's poem portrays a lovesick soul mired in memories of sorrow, pleasure, and desire. It turns to the hopeful image of a lone lily. This pale flower rises above the others in a hothouse and is ensconced in radiant moonlight.

The translation is loose and necessarily loses some of the original's sound symbolism. Schoenberg changed "Schwermut" ("melancholy", opening line of poem) to "Sehnsucht" ("longing"), by intent or error. He also changed "das blattgewordne Leid" (end of third stanza), in the accusative case, to "dem blattgeword'nen Leid" in the dative case. The former conveys a direct, active becoming of sorrow into foliage, while the latter emphasizes sorrow as enduring and rooted in its presence, having become foliage.

==== Setting to voice and music ====
===== Musical setting =====
In word paintings of the poem's imagery, Schoenberg uses the timbral palette of the ensemble, rhythmic patterns, and ornamented, interrelated cyclic and motivic figures. A passage of octave voicings reaching their height on staccato celesta (mm. 2–3) marks the greenhouse's "blue glass" ("blaues Glas", opening line of poem). A low triplet ostinato (m. 6) paints snoring, like its cross-linguistic onomatopoeias, upon "slumber" ("Schlummer", end of first stanza).

Intricate, interlocking figures layered over increasingly turbulent low-register textures depict merely ornamental blooms and dark, entangled foliage inside, which the poem associates with emotions and drives. The song's longest measure (m. 19) underscores their persistence as a sick, moonlit lily's appeal to transcend them is evoked by figures incorporating interval cycles unfolding rhythmically and shimmering repetitively in arabesque passages for celesta and harp.

===== Vocal setting =====
Ranging a nearly three-octave tessitura, the song's vocal melody outlines the poem's narrative using melodic motion, localized contouring, and a gradual rise in register. It

- descends to rest on the soprano's lowest pitch, G♯_{3} (m. 6), on the final syllable of "Schlummer" ("slumber", end of first stanza) and again briefly (m. 12, in the manner of passing) on the second syllable of "kühle Moose" ("cool moss", end of second stanza);
- rises to the first of several local maximums, C_{6} (mm. 16–17), marked pppp and held on the second syllable of "empor" ("upwards", third line of third stanza); and
- culminates in a passage with the soprano's highest pitch, F_{6} (m. 27), also marked pppp and held at length on the first syllable of "mystiches Gebet" ("mystical prayer", end of poem).

==== Ending ====
The fleeting conclusion (mm. 29–30) reworks prior figures into musical gestures of falling lines. As the melody accelerates by rhythmic subdivison, harmonic motion is suspended without resolution. The song ends like the poem, without answer to the lily's prayer and as if "in mid air". Some analysts note that the song seems to return cyclically to its beginning, and so they likewise interpret the lily's arc as merely part of a cyclical narrative.

=== Cultural context ===
Klammer and Oppeln-Bronikowski translated Maeterlinck's Serres chaudes as Im Treibhaus (lit. 'In the Greenhouse'), the same name as the third of Wagner's Wesendonck Lieder. Wagner's song portrays sorrowful plants confined in a sheltered enclosure, longing for their distant Heimat (lit. 'homeland'), and was a study for the Act 3 Prelude to Tristan und Isolde. Schoenberg likely knew it.

Gordon Root argues that Schoenberg's stylistically modernist setting offers "Herzgewächse" a nonetheless Romantic reading. The music celebrates the desire to transcend but ultimately frames this as part of an endless cycle of desire as such. Here, Herzgewächse is tied to the tradition of Wagner's Tristan und Isolde and Arthur Schopenhauer's The World as Will and Representation. Schoenberg himself once wrote, in an undated aphorism, "Longing is the only positive happiness; fulfillment is disappointment." (Note: Schoenberg's original text: "Sehnsucht ist das einzige positive Glück; Erfüllung ist Enttäuschung.")

Andreas Meyer compares the song, particularly in its imagery and instrumentation, to Bruno Taut's 1914 Glass Pavilion (German: Glashaus-Pavillon, sometimes shortened to Glashaus). In their respective media, both use what is colorful, opaque, and vitreous to symbolize hidden inner worlds, a hallmark of Expressionism. For Kandinsky, as in Herzgewächse, blue is linked not only with veiled sorrow, but also with desire for the infinite, the pure, and the supernatural.

Paulo F. de Castro noted themes of spiritual transcendence in Herzgewächse and Schoenberg's String Quartet No. 2, Berg's Violin Concerto, or Gustav Mahler's music.

== Reception ==
=== Performance history ===
The early performance history of Herzgewächse is somewhat ambiguous, in part due to its first publication and circulation in Der Blaue Reiter from 1912. Universal Edition possessed a music engraving by 1914 but delayed publication until 1920 amid World War I and the Revolutions of 1917–1923, with economic disruption and rising inflation culminating in the Austrian hyperinflation. They issued a piano–vocal score by Felix Greissle in 1925.

With its extreme vocal demands and some ambiguity as to the harmonium part's realization, the song has been infrequently performed since its omission from a planned 1912 Berlin premiere. Uncertainties regarding the type of harmonium, intended sound, and registration have sometimes led to the use of electronic substitutes. A full registration is notated in an autograph manuscript from the 1912 Berlin rehearsal process attended by Schoenberg, enabling more historically informed performance.

==== 1912: Planned premieres ====
===== Germany =====
Schoenberg planned for Martha Winternitz-Dorda, an Austrian soprano at the Hamburg State Opera (1910–1933), to sing Herzgewächse at Willy Simon's Harmonium-Saal, Lützowplatz, Berlin. Louis Closson was to play celesta, and Max Saal, harp. Harmonium keyboardist Paula Simon-Herlitz, Willy's wife, withdrew on 21 January 1912; Webern stepped in. The 28 January concert was delayed by scheduling conflicts. Following rehearsals on 2 and 3 February, it was reset for 4 February.

Winternitz-Dorda cut Herzgewächse from the already printed all-Schoenberg concert program due to its vocal demands, short notice, or both. Eduard Steuermann accompanied her in The Book of the Hanging Gardens (1908) and Lieder later grouped in Opp. 2 and 6 (1899–1905). Closson and Steuermann joined Louis Gruenberg and Webern on two pianos (eight hands), led by Schoenberg in Nos. 1–2 and 4 of the Five Pieces for Orchestra (1909), using the transcription Webern adapted from Erwin Stein's earlier draft. Filling in for Egon Petri, Closson played the Six Little Piano Pieces (1911). Ferruccio Busoni and Oskar Fried attended. Reviews were mixed.

Schoenberg hoped Winternitz-Dorda might sing Herzgewächse later, perhaps at Max Reinhardt's theater, also in Berlin.

===== Austria =====
In 1912, an Austrian premiere of Hergewächse was planned through Vienna's Akademischer Verband für Literatur und Musik (lit. 'Academic Association for Literature and Music', founded 1908; sponsor of the 1913 Skandalkonzert, lit. 'scandal concert'). Berg or Schoenberg asked Winternitz-Dorda to sing. Paul Stefan suggested that Schoenberg lecture on Mahler to the Association that March, but Schoenberg's negative experiences in Vienna led him to decline a visit. He did send six aphorisms to the Association's journal Der Ruf, edited by Stefan, Erhard Buschbeck, and Ludwig Ullman, but objected to how these were edited. Though Association concerts included his music, they never featured Herzgewächse.

==== 1922: World premiere ====
Jean Wiéner organized the 30 March 1922 world premiere of Herzgewächse at one of his concerts salade (lit. 'salad concerts'), officially billed as Concerts Wiéner, at Paris's Salle Gaveau. He challenged traditionalist and nationalist tastes in post-World War I France with pluralist "amour pour toutes les musiques vraies" (lit. 'love for all true music'), including then-contemporary or avant-garde classical music from international scenes and crossover music inspired by African-American music.

Mathilde Veille-Lavallée or Renée Valnay (sources differ) sang as Darius Milhaud led Herzgewächse with Francis Poulenc (celesta), Wiéner (harmonium), and Susanne Dalliés (harp). Wiéner played his own improvised Blues (danses américaines) and Igor Stravinsky's Piano-Rag-Music. The Pro Arte Quartet played Alois Hába's String Quartet No. 1, Milhaud's String Quartet No. 4, and the French premiere of Schoenberg's String Quartet No. 2 with soprano Marya Freund in the last two movements.

Louis Vuillemin criticized the series in a 1 January 1923 Le Courrier musical review, "Concerts Métèques" (German: "Konzerte mißliebiger Ausländer"; English: "Concerts of Unpopular Foreigners"). In reply, André Caplet, Maurice Ravel, Alexis Roland-Manuel, and Albert Roussel supported Wiéner's concerts in an open letter.

==== Subsequent premieres ====
===== 1923: United States =====
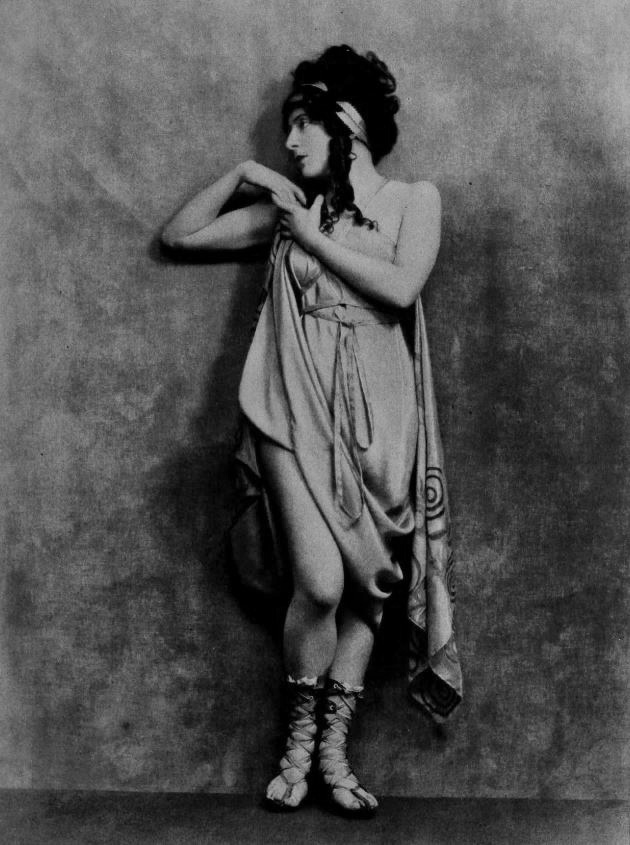
Operatic soprano Eva Leoni sang the 1923 United States premiere of Herzgewächse.

Soprano Eva Leoni, conductor Carlos Salzedo or possibly E. Robert Schmitz (sources differ), and musicians affiliated with Salzedo's and Edgard Varèse's International Composers Guild gave the Lied its 1923 United States premiere in New York City. It was paired with Béla Bartók's Improvisations (1920), Arthur Lourié's Synthèses (1914), the march and nocturne from Paul Hindemith's Suite 1922, and Stravinsky's Renard (1915–1916).

Here Herzgewächse was a popular success, encored on audience demand. Lawrence Gilman lauded its "iridescent web of delicate and poignant beauty" and Leoni's "beautiful voice" in the New York Tribune.

===== 1925: Germany =====
In their second season opening concert on 4 October 1925, Ewald Lindemann's Arbeitsgemeinschaft für Neue Musik (lit. 'Working Group for New Music', mostly Theater Freiburg volunteers) gave Herzgewächse its apparent German premiere at Freiburg im Bresgau's Historical Merchants' Hall. Lindemann secured City-funded free admission by promising to boost tourism and worked with the Collegium Musicum of Hermann Erpf, writing in the Freiburger Tagesblatt that he sought to educate the public on the ties between new and old music. They marked Johann Sebastian Bach's 175th death anniversary with the chaconne from the Violin Partita No. 2 and also included Webern's Six Bagatelles for string quartet (played twice), Berg's Clarinet Pieces, and Stravinsky's Berceuses du chat.

The printed program introduced only Stravinsky and Webern; London's D. E. Pike called Freiburg "a stronghold of the Schönberg cult", crediting Schoenberg's rise and confidence to "unswerving support" from Busoni, Marie Gutheil-Schoder, Mahler, and the Rosé Quartet. He said the "remote and delicate" song, with its unusual instrumentation and bold vocality, prefigured Die glückliche Hand (1910–1913) and Pierrot lunaire (1912). The Arbeitsgemeinschaft folded in 1928 when the City's expert Wilibald Gurlitt opposed reimbursing it for a Pierrot performance that Lindemann said had required him to hire Viennese, not local, musicians.

===== 1928: Austria =====
Marianne Rau-Hoeglauer sang and Webern conducted the 17 April 1928 Austrian premiere of Herzgewächse with Schoenberg's support, but not his presence, at one of the Kolisch Quartet subscription concerts in Vienna's Kleiner Musikverein-Saal (Smaller Music Association Hall), later the Brahms-Saal (Brahms Hall). It was generally well received and repeated once. The program also included Bach's Brandenburg Concerto No. 5.

Paul Pisk hailed Rau-Hoeglauer as "master of all difficulties" in the Berliner Börsen-Zeitung. Webern took great care in conducting it and considered the music of "highest quality", having called it the "pinnacle of music" when he first studied it in 1912. Darla Crispin notes his "gushing 'operaphile'" enthusiasm for the wide-ranging coloratura of the soprano part. "We reveled in ... sounds we had scarcely dreamed of", Berg wrote Schoenberg. "[E]very one of your works creates an unprecedented sensation in the listener on first hearing", he added, "even if ... 20 years old, like this one".

A Wiener Allgemeine Zeitung critic (or critics) signed R. K. found the song "übersättigt mit revolutionären Radikalismen" ("oversaturated with revolutionary radicalisms"), beginning with what they described as its polytonality. They further described what they heard as its "Umwandlung der Singstimme in ein Instrument und der Instrumente in Klangfarben" ("conversion of the singing voice into an instrument and the instruments into tone colors"), and its "Atomisierung einer ... Teil-thematik" ("atomization of ... bits of themes").

==== Post-World War II performances ====
===== 1945: France =====
After World War II, on 5 December 1945, Lucienne Tragin sang and René Leibowitz conducted Herzgewächse at the Paris Conservatory's old Salle des Concerts, with Yvette Grimaud (celesta), Lily Laskine (harp), and Pierre Boulez (harmonium), who hand-copied the score. A 30 November 1945 Combat preview named Leibowitz the "principal representative in Paris of Schoenberg's school" and remembered Webern as recently "assassinated by a Nazi". (Hans and Rosaleen Moldenhauer later determined that a U.S. soldier shot Webern dead by accident.) The concert program focused on music of the Second Viennese School, with members of the Orchestre National de France also performing Leibowitz's Chamber Concerto, Op. 18, Schoenberg's Chamber Symphony No. 1, and Webern's Symphony.

===== 1950–1952: United States =====
Between 1939 and 1954, writer Peter B. Yates and his wife, pianist Frances Mullen Yates, organized Los Angeles performances of most of Schoenberg's chamber music, including several premieres on the West Coast of the United States. Their nationally covered, volunteer-run concert series, Evenings on the Roof (later the Monday Evening Concerts), promoted both modernist and early music. Through Richard Buhlig, they befriended Schoenberg, sharing a passion for Busoni's music. Yates disclosed to Schoenberg that Charles Ives had partly funded some of these Schoenberg performances.

In the thirteenth season (1950–1951), Marni Nixon sang the West Coast premiere of Herzgewächse. Unable to find a harmonium, the series substituted a Hammond organ. Nixon feared repeating the song's F_{6} but obliged when the audience demanded an encore. On 22 September 1952, she sang it again (and gave another encore) with her husband Ernest Gold conducting, as part of concerts marking Schoenberg's 1951 death.

One performance aired live on Julius Toldi's Music of Today (KFWB), which often featured Schoenberg's music. Late in life, Schoenberg said on air that his music was being shunned in the broader U.S. as "controversial", drawing national attention. He apologized for this and thanked Toldi for his efforts, telling him, "should my work still be appreciated later on, this deed will never be forgotten".

=== Influence ===
The song's timbral and vocal range likely influenced the first version of Boulez's cantata Le Visage nuptial (1946–1947), with the latter's soprano range of F♯_{3} to B_{5}. Schoenberg's account of inspiration from the poem "Herzgewächse" and of the "ecstasy" of spontaneously through-composed music in his essay "The Relationship to the Text" parallels Boulez's own compositional method in Visage nuptial, which is "literally organized" around its text. Schoenberg's next work, Pierrot lunaire, likely influenced Boulez's use of sprechstimme (lit. 'speaking voice') in the cantata.

== Recordings ==
- Marni Nixon (soprano), Leonard Stein (celesta), Wesley Kuhnle (harmonium), Barbara Shik (harp); Robert Craft (conductor). Recorded 21 July 1954, Columbia Studios, New York City. Columbia Records, 1956; reissued Sony Classical, 2023. (Premiere recording)
- Rita Tritter (soprano), George Silfies (celesta), Paul Jacobs (harmonium), Laura Newell (harp); Robert Craft (conductor). Recorded 17 December 1963, Manhattan Center, New York City. Columbia Records, 1965; reissued Sony Classical, 2023.
- Mady Mesplé (soprano), members of the Domaine musical; Gilbert Amy (conductor). Recorded 7 December 1970, Théâtre de la Ville, Paris. EMI Records, 1986.
- June Barton (soprano), John Constable (celesta), Harold Leston (harmonium), Sidonie Goossens (harp); David Atherton (conductor). Recorded 17 October – December 1973, Petersham, London. Decca Records, 1973; reissued Telefunken, 1975.
- Dorothy Dorow (soprano), Stanley Hoogland (celesta), Maarten Bon (harmonium), Vera Badings (harp) of the Amsterdam Ensemble; Reinbert de Leeuw (conductor). Telefunken, 1978.
- Lucy Shelton (soprano), Sarah Rothenberg (celesta), James David Christie (harmonium), and Susan Jolles (harp) of the Da Capo Chamber Players; Oliver Knussen (conductor). Recorded July 1991, Houghton Chapel, Wellesley College, Wellesley, MA. Bridge Records, 1992.
- Eileen Hulse (soprano), members of the London Symphony Orchestra; Robert Craft (conductor). Recorded 28–29 May 1994, Abbey Road Studios, London. Koch Entertainment, 1995; reissued Naxos, 2007.
- Christine Schäfer (soprano), Hideki Nagano (celesta), Dimitri Vassilakis (harmonium), and Frédérique Cambreling (harp) of the Ensemble intercontemporain; Pierre Boulez (conductor). Recorded September 1997, IRCAM, Paris. Deutsche Grammophon, 1998.
