= Pietro Scarpini =

Italian classical pianist

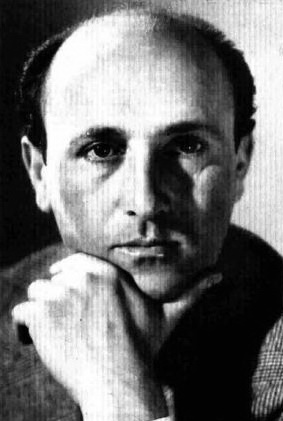
Pietro Scarpini

Pietro Scarpini (Roma, 6 April 1911 – Firenze, 27 November 1997) was an Italian classical pianist, harpsichordist, composer and conductor, who had an international performing career as a pianist from the late 1930s to the late 1960s. He was particularly known for interpreting 20th-century repertoire, including Schoenberg's Pierrot lunaire and Busoni's "vast and fiendishly difficult" Piano Concerto.

== Biography ==
Scarpini was born in Rome in 1911. His mother was a pianist. He studied piano with Alfredo Casella and composition with Ottorino Respighi at the Accademia Nazionale di Santa Cecilia of his home city, where he was additionally taught by Alessandro Bustini, Bernardino Molinari (conducting) and Fernando Germani (organ). While still a student, he married Teresita Rimer, also a musician, in 1934. He graduated in 1937. At the behest of his father, an army officer, he also studied literature and philosophy the University of Rome.

His first public performance came in 1936, and the following year, Scarpini substituted as the soloist at a concert at the Teatro Adriano in Rome, playing Mozart's Piano Concerto No. 9 (Jeunehomme) with the Orchestra dell'Accademia Nazionale di Santa Cecilia. His performance was well received, and led to engagements to play in Berlin with the Berlin Philharmonic Orchestra, and then to concerts in Florence, Budapest, Berlin and Lübeck in 1938.

His performing career was interrupted by the Second World War; after briefly teaching at the Parma Conservatory, he settled at the Conservatorio Luigi Cherubini in Florence in 1940, remaining on the faculty until 1967. After the war, he resumed touring within Europe, and from 1954, he also performed in the US and Canada. In the 1940s, he assembled a group – the Ensemble of the Accademia Filarmonica Romana – to perform Schoenberg's Pierrot lunaire in Europe, which he conducted. His career was hampered by ill health; he was diagnosed with diabetes in 1956, and had a heart attack in 1982. He retired from public performance towards the end of the 1960s but continued to teach, from 1967 at the Milan Conservatory. He also taught at Accademia Musicale Chigiana in Siena, and held the international chair in piano for contemporary music in Darmstadt, Germany. His notable students include the American pianist, David Burge.

As a composer, Scarpini arranged Mahler's Symphony No. 10 for two pianos (early 1950s), and wrote a piano concerto and a piano quintet.

He died on 27 November 1997 in Florence.

== Repertoire ==
Scarpini's pre-war repertoire included works by contemporary composers such as Hindemith, a frequent collaborator from the beginning of his career, as well as Poulenc and Stravinsky. He premiered the Piano Sonata by the American composer Hunter Johnson in 1934, and Variations, Fugue, and Envoi on a Theme of Handel by the Russian–Italian composer Igor Markevitch in 1941. During this period, he also frequently performed music from earlier eras, including Bach (in arrangement by Busoni), Scarlatti, Beethoven, Brahms, Schumann, Chopin, Liszt, Rachmaninov and Debussy.

From the late 1940s, Scarpini began to concentrate on 20th-century works, notably Schoenberg's Pierrot lunaire and Piano Concerto, and works by Busoni, including his Don Juan Fantasy. The Italian composer Luigi Dallapiccola was a friend, and Scarpini performed his music including Sonatina canonica (1943), which was dedicated to him. Another dedication was Remo Giazotto's Au Tombeau de Ravel (1959). Scarpini also met the American composer Roger Sessions, and played his Piano Concerto in Europe in 1957. From the mid-1950s he became associated with playing Scriabin.

Contemporary and 20th-century music was not his only interest; from the late 1950s, he performed Bach's The Art of Fugue and The Well-Tempered Clavier on the piano, and in 1964 also began to perform on the harpsichord.

== Reception ==
The music historian Andrea Olmstead describes Scarpini as the foremost post-war Italian pianist. Sometimes called a virtuoso, reviews of his concerts and recordings often praise his technical proficiency in playing difficult repertoire. The British composer Reginald Smith Brindle comments that Scarpini "can pack a theatre to overflowing with a programme quite foreign to the hackneyed repertory of pianists, whether it be Bach or Schoenberg." His version of Pierrot lunaire, as pianist and conductor, was praised as being "entirely sympathetic to the composer's intention" and having "a quite extraordinary skill and artistry" by a reviewer for The Musical Times in 1949.

In 1966, Scarpini was the soloist in Busoni's rarely performed Piano Concerto at Carnegie Hall, marking the composer's centenary, with George Szell conducting the Cleveland Orchestra; an article in Time describes the event: "...the tiny man, exploding chords like cannoncrackers, hurled himself upon the piano, and for the next 72 minutes ... blasted away with a display of percussive pianistics that rattled the hall so hard nobody noticed the sound of a subway train thundering within 40 feet of the stage" adding that he and the orchestra "safely and on the whole admirably negotiated the longest and, in the opinion of many pianists, the most difficult piano concerto ever composed." His playing "created a sensation in New York", but the concert did not please all the American music critics; B. H. Haggin complains in The Hudson Review of Scarpini's "interminable rehashing of everything he had heard in his pretentious piece of worthless Kapellmeistermusik."

He was also known for playing Bach. The Art of Fugue was considered an unusual programme choice at the time; Smith Brindle comments in The Musical Times of 1955 that "This is no programme for the ordinary public", writing that some people considered Scarpini to be "off form". Smith Brindle describes the performance as "magnificent ... every voice had crystal clarity, and he transformed what has been termed a series of exercises into a marvellous experience."

== Recordings ==
Olmstead writes that Scarpini "disdained recording", and he released very few recordings during his lifetime. He did contribute to a 1974 record celebrating Dallapiccola's 70th birthday, playing Tartiniana Seconda and Due Studi with the violinist Sandro Materassi (released by Rhine Classics), in a performance praised by the composer Oliver Knussen. A performance of Busoni's Piano Concerto recorded live for Bayerischer Rundfunk in Munich c. 1968, with the Bavarian Radio Symphony Orchestra and Chorus conducted by Rafael Kubelík, was released on compact disc by First Hand Recordings. Ivan Hewett, in a review for The Daily Telegraph, describes Scarpini's playing as "emotionally capacious" and "alive to the diabolical humour" in the work's second movement.

Rhine Classics have recently released an edition of all Scarpini's recorded material, mainly from privately recorded tapes, on 33 compact discs, under the series title "Discovered Tapes". Rob Cowan, in a review of the Bach set for Gramophone, compares Scarpini's "breadth and romantic rubato" in The Well-Tempered Clavier to Wanda Landowska's interpretation, while considering some of his speeds to be "extremely broad".

=== Arbiter Records ===
- Arbiter 131 | Beethoven: Piano Concerto No.4 | Piano Sonata Op.111 | RAI Roma/Furtwängler (℗ & © 2007)

=== First Hand Records ===
- FHR64 | Busoni: Piano Concerto Op.39 | Bavarian RSO/Kubelik (℗ & © 2018)

=== Rhine Classics | Pietro Scarpini Edition ===
The Italian master pianist Pietro Scarpini played Bach's "Die Kunst der Fuge" from memory and was an early pioneer of Schönberg, Berg, Busoni, Dallapiccola and Hindemith. Until now his art remained almost inaccessible. Rhine Classics' complete collection, made by 33 discs, comprehensively represent all the significant recordings left by Scarpini, many recorded privately.

- RH-007 | 6CD | Pietro Scarpini -1- Busoni & Liszt (℗ & © 2018) review
- RH-010 | 12CD | Pietro Scarpini -2- from Baroque to Contemporary (℗ & © 2018) review
- RH-014 | 2CD | Pietro Scarpini -3- Mozart (℗ & © 2018) review
- RH-017 | 6CD | Pietro Scarpini -4- Bach (℗ & © 2020) review
- RH-020 | 2CD | Pietro Scarpini -5- Beethoven (℗ & © 2021) review
- RH-021 | 5CD | Pietro Scarpini -6- Mahler ...and beyond (℗ & © 2021) review

== Podcasts ==
- "Well-Tempered" Pianists on Between the Keys, January 19th and 20th WWFM The Classical Network (© 2021 by Jed Distler)
