= Doctor of Fine Arts =

Academic degree

Doctor of Fine Arts (DFA) is a professional doctoral degree in fine arts. It may also be awarded as an honorary degree.

== Description ==
Doctoral programmes leading to DFAs in the UK are of equivalent level to a PhD, with the same requirement to demonstrate new knowledge, but typically contain a practical component and a more structured programme of learning than a PhD. DFA programmes are offered by universities including the University of Hertfordshire and the University of East London. The research outputs required may include a thesis and an exhibited body of work or an exhibition combined with a written report. At Yale University in the US, the DFA may be conferred as an earned degree on students who have graduated with a Master of Fine Arts degree from the Yale School of Drama and who have completed a dissertation.

In 2016 ELIA (European League of the Institutes of the Arts) launched the Florence Principles on the Doctorate in the Arts. The Florence Principles, relating to the Salzburg Principles and the Salzburg Recommendations of the European University Association, name seven points of attention to specify PhDs and other doctorates in the arts. The Florence Principles were endorsed by the European Association of Conservatoires, the International Association of Film and Television Schools, the International Association of Universities and Colleges of Art, Design and Media, the European Association for Architectural Education and the Society for Artistic Research.

As an honorary degree, the DFA is typically conferred on a recipient who has made a significant contribution to society in the fine arts. Notable individuals who have received honorary DFAs include: Georgia O'Keeffe, Taylor Swift,, Oscar Isaac, Frank Stella, Carmen De Lavallade, Anna Deavere Smith, Jacques d'Amboise, Bill Pullman, Abelardo Morell, Twyla Tharp, Gordon Parks, Seth MacFarlane, and Jack Nicholson.

== See also ==
- Doctor of Arts (DA) – sometimes an honorary and sometimes an earned degree
- Doctor of Humane Letters (DHL) – typically an honorary degree
- Doctor of Music (DMus, DM or MusD) – sometimes an honorary and sometimes an earned degree
- Doctor of Philosophy (PhD) – typically an earned degree
