= Live entertainment =

Live entertainment may refer to:

- LIVE Entertainment, a former name of Artisan Entertainment
- Live entertainment performed in the presence of the viewer
- Various kinds of live performance

== See also ==
- Live Nation Entertainment, American global entertainment company
- Lagardère Live Entertainment, entertainment agency subsidiary of Lagardère Group
- Disney Live Entertainment, theatrical live entertainment production division of Walt Disney Imagineering
- Live Entertainment Corporation of Canada, better known as Livent
- Live: Entertainment or Death, 1999 live album by American heavy metal band Mötley Crüe
- Entertainment Live, Philippine showbiz oriented talk show
