= Henk Borgdorff =

Amsterdam-based scholar

- Born: Hendrik Anne Borgdorff; The Hague
- Known for: artistic research & music theory

Henk Borgdorff is an Amsterdam-based academic, specialised in music theory and artistic research. He is emeritus professor for research in the arts at Leiden University and at the Royal Conservatory of The Hague, University of the Arts The Hague (Netherlands).

== Education ==
Henk Borgdorff was born in 1954 in The Hague (Netherlands). He studied music theory at the Royal Conservatory of The Hague (1977-1983) and philosophy and sociology at Leiden University (1978-1982). He graduated in The Hague in 1983 with a thesis on the philosophy of music of Theodor W. Adorno and obtained his PhD at Leiden University in 2012.

== Academic career ==
From 1983 to 2002 he taught music theory and aesthetics in Hilversum (1983-1994), The Hague (1990-1994) and Amsterdam (1994-2002), with a focus on Renaissance counterpoint and philosophy of music. Together with his wife, Barbara Bleij, he founded in 1996 the Dutch Journal of Music Theory (later: Music Theory and Analysis (MTA) - International Journal of the Dutch-Flemish Society for Music Theory), and acted as chair of the editorial board until 2008.

In 2002 Borgdorff was appointed professor ('lector') in Art Theory & Research at the Amsterdam University of the Arts (until 2010) where he led an interdisciplinary research group, ARTI (Art Research, Theory, and Interpretation). His own research started from there on to focus on the theoretical and political rationale of research in the arts (artistic research; more on this below.) Together with Jeroen Boomgaard (Rietveld Academy) he founded the Artistic Research master programme at the University of Amsterdam, and together with Peter Dejans (Orpheus Institute, Ghent) and Frans de Ruiter (Royal Conservatory of The Hague) he established the doctoral programme in music, docARTES.

In 2010 Borgdorff took a position as professor ('lector') Research in the Arts at the University of the Arts The Hague (until 2020) and a position as visiting professor in Aesthetics at the Faculty of Fine, Applied and Performing Arts at the University of Gothenburg, Sweden (until 2013). In 2016 he was appointed full professor in Theory of Research in the Arts at the Academy of Creative and Performing Arts (ACPA), Leiden University, and acted as academic director of ACPA until his retirement in December 2020.

Borgdorff was involved in the establishment of the Journal for Artistic Research (JAR) and the associated Society for Artistic Research (SAR). He served as editor of JAR from 2010 to 2015, co-founded the Research Catalogue in 2011, acted as president of SAR from 2015 to 2019.

== Academic work ==
Borgdorff is best known for his contributions to the field of artistic research - a field also referred to as practice-based or practice-led research in the creative and performing arts (notably in the UK), or research-creation/recherche-création (in Canada and France). Some of Borgdorff’s work is collected in The Conflict of the Faculties. Perspectives on Artistic Research and Academia.

In his 2005 The Debate on Research in the Arts Borgdorff introduces four perspectives on the relationship between theory and practice in the arts: the interpretative, instrumental, performative and immanent perspective. These perspectives form the basis for a distinction between three forms of art research: research on the arts, research for the arts, and research in and through the arts (the latter synonymously with artistic research), thereby deviating from an earlier distinction made by Christopher Frayling.

In ‘The Production of Knowledge in Artistic Research’ (2011) Borgdorff has worked out more in detail the specific epistemological and methodological features of artistic research, drawing on research on tacit knowledge and embodied knowledge. By comparing artistic research with research in the humanities, the social and natural sciences Borgdorff subsequently develops an understanding of artistic research as an advanced form of academic research in its own right, marked by non-conceptual forms of knowing and understanding, unconventional research methods and outcomes, and enhanced forms of documentation and publication.

The contribution of Borgdorff’s work to science policies is most manifest in his Artistic Research within the Fields of Science (2009). Interpreting Gibbons’ Mode-2 knowledge production and Stokes’ Quadrant model of scientific research, he makes a case for including artistic research in the Frascati Manual's classifications of research, science and technology; an appeal later taken up by the publication of the Vienna Declaration on Artistic Research.

In his later work Borgdorff has focused on the criteria for assessment of artistic research, and on the relationship between artistic research and science and technology studies (STS).

== Criticism ==
Borgdorff’s work has been criticized by some as inimical to art practice and to facilitate an objectionable form of academization of art.

== Books authored or edited ==
- Dialogues between Artistic Research and Science and Technology Studies, ed. By Henk Borgdorff, Peter Peters and Trevor Pinch. London/New York: Routledge 2020
- The Exposition of Artistic Research: Publishing Art in Academia, ed. by Michael Schwab and Henk Borgdorff. Leiden: Leiden University Press, 2013
- The Conflict of the Faculties: Perpectives on Artistic Research and Academia. Leiden: Leiden University Press, 2012
- Denken in Kunst: Theorie en reflectie in het kunstonderwijs [Thinking in Art: Theory and Reflection in Higher Arts Education], ed. by Henk Borgdorff and Peter Sonderen. Leiden: Leiden University Press, 2012
- Artistic Research within the Fields of Science (Sensuous Knowledge 06). Bergen, Bergen National Academy of the Arts 2009.
- The Debate on Research in the Arts (Sensuous Knowledge 02), Bergen, Bergen National Academy of the Arts (2006).
