= Victorian College of the Arts =

Arts campus of the University of Melbourne, Australia

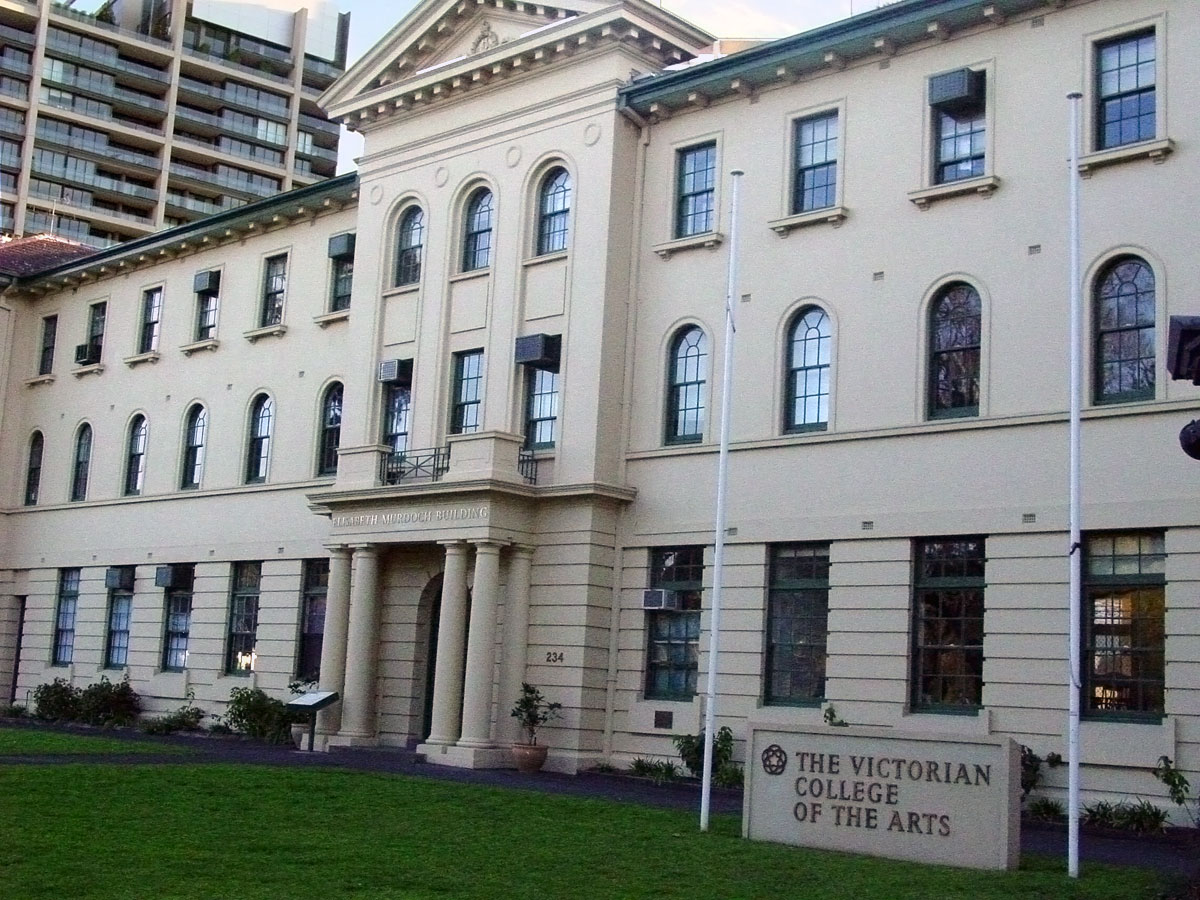
- Other name: VCA/FFAM
- Type: Public
- Established: 1972; 54 years ago
- Dean: Marie Sierra
- Director: Emma Redding
- Academic staff: 116
- Students: 1,300
- Location: Southbank, Victoria, Australia; 37.8248°S 144.9702°E
- Campus: Urban (Southbank Campus) 4 hectares
- Website: finearts-music.unimelb.edu.au/about-us/vca

The Victorian College of the Arts (VCA) is the arts school at the University of Melbourne in Australia. It is part of the university's Faculty of Fine Arts and Music (FFAM). It is located near the Melbourne city centre on the Southbank campus of the university. The VCA Film and Television School was founded in 1991, after it assumed ownership and management of the Swinburne Film and Television School.

Courses and training offered at the VCA cover seventeen discipline areas: acting and theatre, composition, creative arts and music therapy, dance, design and production, ethnomusicology, film and television, Indigenous arts and culture, interactive composition, jazz and improvisation, music performance, music psychology, music theatre, musicology, performance teaching, visual art, and writing. The VCA is also home to the Wilin Centre for Indigenous Arts and Cultural Development.

The library on the Southbank campus is known as the Lenton Parr Music, Visual and Performing Arts Library.

== History ==
=== 1972: establishment ===
The National Gallery of Victoria Art School, founded in 1867 to teach fine art, was the VCA's foundation school.

The Victorian College of the Arts was established in 1972 by a government order under the Victorian Institute of Colleges Act 1955, initiated by the Premier of Victoria and Minister for the Arts, Rupert Hamer. Subsequently, in 1973 the VCA was affiliated as a college of advanced education with the Victorian Institute of Colleges. The School of Music was established in 1974, the School of Drama in 1976 and the School of Dance in 1978.

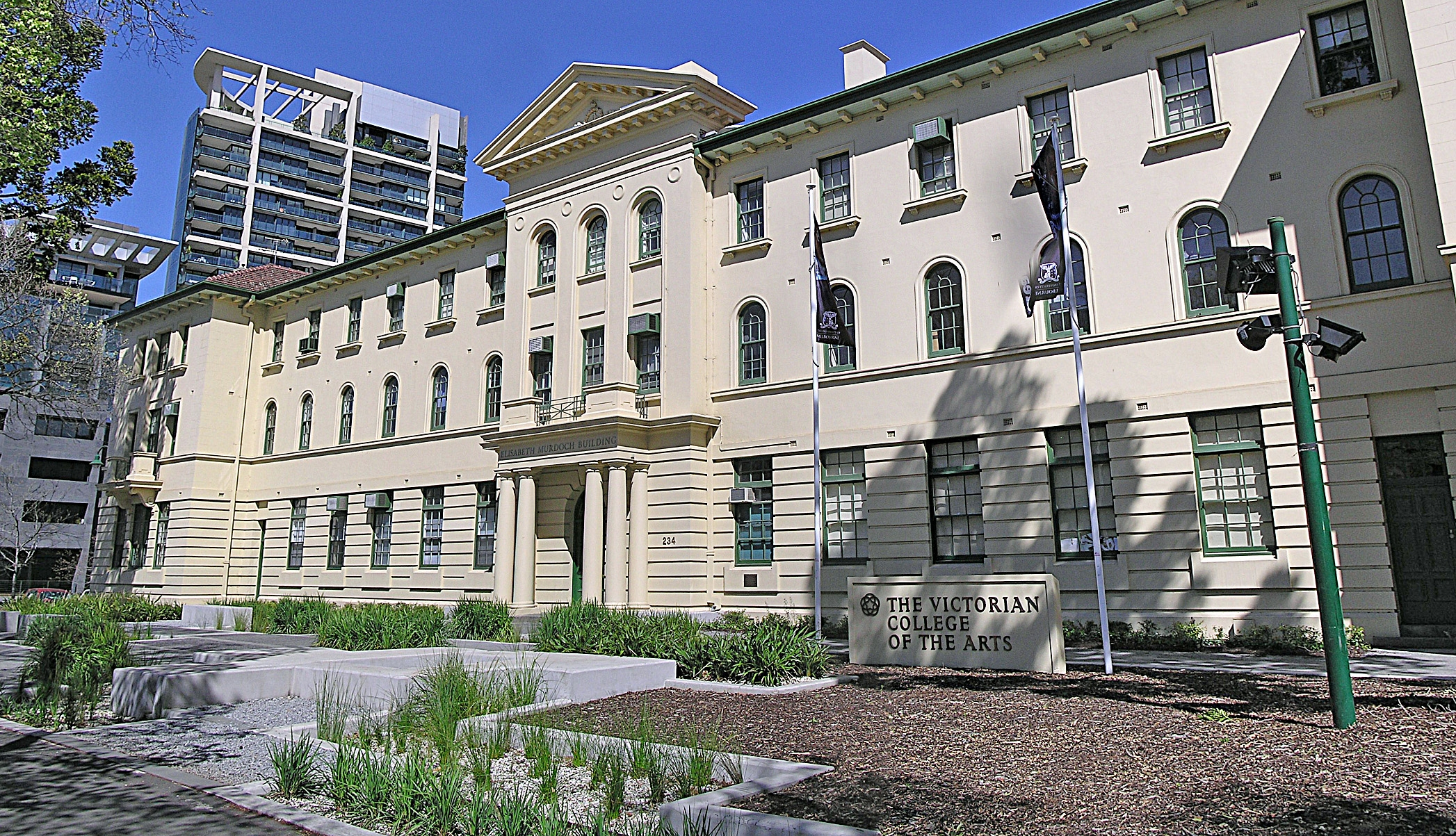
The Elisabeth Murdoch Building at the VCA on St Kilda Road

Also in 1978, the Victorian Education Department under the direction of the Deputy Premier and Minister of Education, Lindsay Thompson, established the Victorian College of the Arts Technical School, a government secondary school for dancers and musicians (see Victorian College of the Arts Secondary School) in close association with the VCA and located on the same campus.

=== 1981: reconstitution ===
In March 1981, the Minister for the Arts and Minister for Educational Services, Norman Lacy, had the Victorian College of the Arts Act 1981 (No. 9566) passed through the Victorian Parliament. Its purpose was the reconstitution of the Victorian College of the Arts (VCA) made necessary by the repeal in 1980 of the Victorian Institute of Colleges Act 1955 and to make it "better able to provide for the preparation of young people to enter upon careers as professional artists. It also represented a significant development for the Victorian Arts Centre."

Lacy laid out a rationale for the re-constitution of the college under a VCA specific act which was derived firstly "from the quite specific demands and circumstances of preparing young artists for professional practise." He asserted that "the basic concept upon which the college is built is that young artists intending to enter careers as practitioners in their various fields are best assisted to achieve their ambitions in a milieu of continuous artistic activity and endeavour of a fully professional nature. To the extent that artistic education is separated from normal professional practice it is so much less effective." Secondly, the rationale related to the adjacent location of the VCA campus to the National Gallery of Victoria and the Victorian Arts Centre. He said that this "Greater Arts Centre concept is central to the government's decision to reconstitute the college by separate statute as well as to the development of the arts in general. It represents a simple, readily achievable and highly effective means of creating a substantial milieu of continuous professional activity of the highest standards. It also has ramifications which extend far beyond the college and its partner institutions. Its implementation will shape and invigorate the arts in many ways and lead to a dynamic, cultural and social facility without peer in Australia" and that it "afforded an unparalleled opportunity and challenge to present total programmes in the arts which should encourage creative exchanges between the art forms, give inspiration to students of the arts and provide for the public an experience which few places in the world can match". The government therefore believed that the VCA's role was substantially different from other educational institutions.

=== 1990s: film school and further expansion ===
==== Film and Television School ====
From January 1991, the ownership and management of the Swinburne Film and Television School (founded 1966) was handed over to VCA, becoming the VCA Film and Television School. Per an announcement in Filmnews in August 1990, the Swinburne Film and Television School was officially transferred to the VCA from January 1991, but would stay at Swinburne until it was able to move to a new building in South Melbourne (funded by $12m from the federal government) in 1993. VCA would merge with Melbourne University during 1991. The VCA's School of Film and Television remained at Hawthorn until 1 July 1994, when it moved into a purpose-built federally funded building on the VCA campus at Southbank. In April 2002, the congress of the CILECT (Centre International de Liaison des Ecoles de Cinema et de Television), the international association of the world's major film and television schools, was held at VCA.

As of 2024 the VCA Film and Television Archive holds around 1,700 short films dating from 1967, which includes the work produced by graduating students of Swinburne Film and Television School students as well as students and faculty of the VCA School of Film and Television School and the Melbourne Conservatorium of Music.

==== Victoria College fine arts ====
On 1 January 1992 further expansion of the college took place when the fine arts programs of the former Faculty of Art and Design, Victoria College (formerly Prahran College of Advanced Education), were incorporated into the School of Art.

=== 2006: University of Melbourne affiliation ===
In 2006 the VCA became an affiliated college of the University of Melbourne, and on 1 January 2007 the VCA became known as the Faculty of the Victorian College of the Arts, University of Melbourne. In April 2009 the school became part of the new Faculty of the VCA and Music (VCAM). The School of Music was amalgamated with the University of Melbourne's Faculty of Music and the VCA Secondary School was separated and given a new campus.

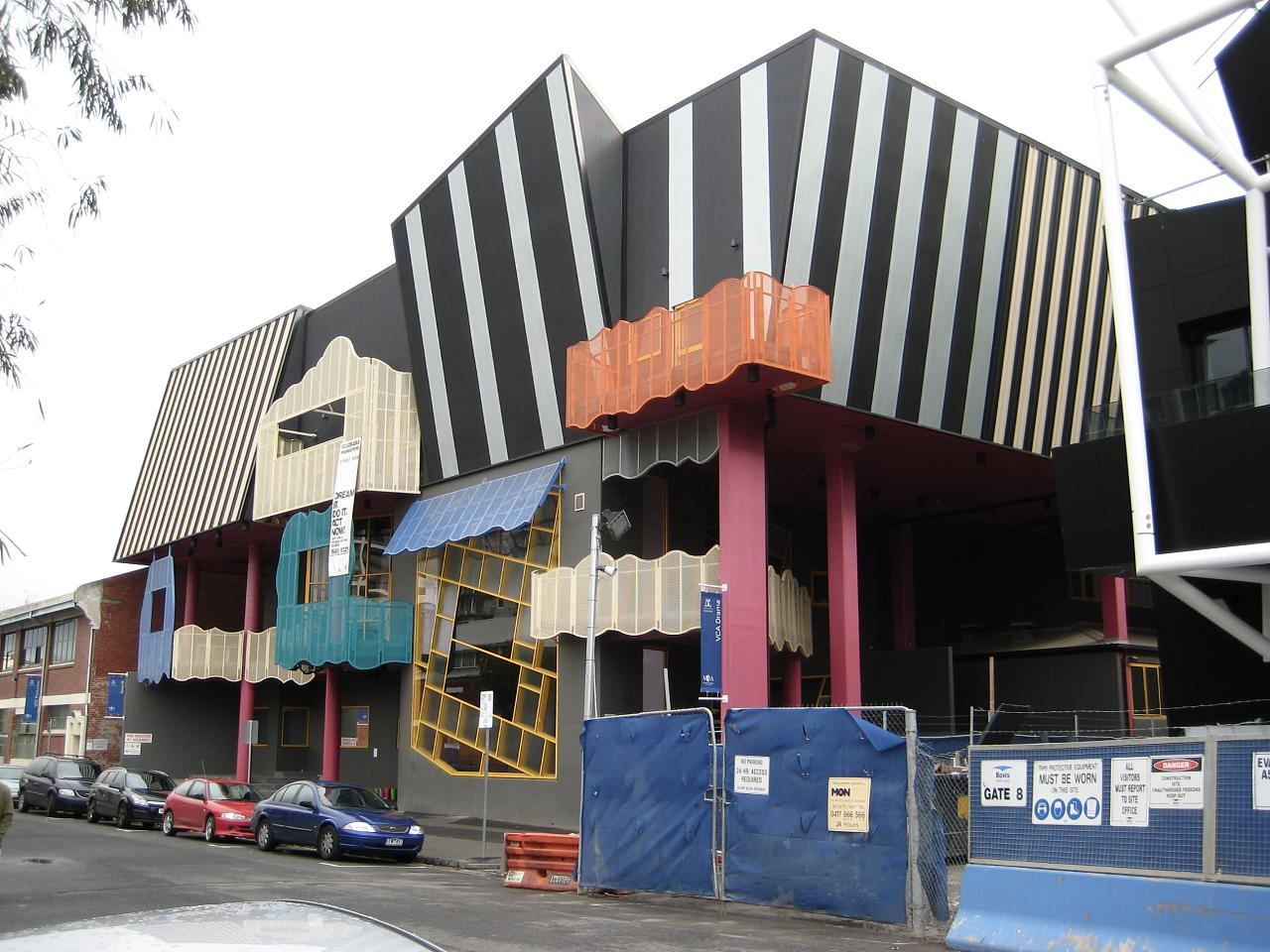
Theatre building at VCA (2009)

With the university requiring the VCA to introduce its Melbourne Model course structure, necessitating a reduction in the amount of hands-on arts training that students receive, critics feared that future students might be unable to find employment upon graduation. Staff of the former VCA accused the dean, Sharman Pretty, of having "little or no recognition of the need for focused arts training, or any esteem for the arts themselves", and the University of Melbourne of trying to mislead the public about the effects. Students were also fearful a reduction in the quality of education and programs on offer whilst the school remained under the University of Melbourne.

=== 2014: further expansion ===
In 2014 a $42.5 million project to expand and improve the VCA was announced. Supported chiefly by the Victorian Government and the University of Melbourne, the initiative aimed to both "ensure that the VCA maintains its high standards in arts training and research" and "open up the campus to the wider community". A portion of the funding was to be spent acquiring and redeveloping the nearby Dodds Street Stables of the Victoria Police mounted branch. Major contributors included the Myer Foundation, the Ian Potter Foundation, and Martyn and Louise Myer.

== Deans or heads ==
The policy of the VCA has always been to enrol only those students who demonstrate the talent and dedication essential for courses as practising artists and performers. Similarly, members of the academic staff, including the director and the dean of each school, have themselves been accomplished and practising artists.

- Lenton Parr AM, founding dean, 1972–1975
- William Kelly, 1975–1982
- John Walker, 1982–1985
- Gareth Sansom, 1986–1991
- Norman Baggaley, 1991–1997
- Mostyn Bramley-Moore, 1997–1999
- Su Baker, 2000–2010
- Barry Conyngham, 2010–2021
- Marie Sierra, 2021–present

== Directors ==
- Lenton Parr, 1972–1984 (Victorian College of the Arts proclaimed 30 November 1972)
- Lionel Lawrence, 1985–1988
- Alwynne Mackie, 1989–1995
- Andrea Hull, 1995–2009
- Su Baker, 2010–2017
- Jon Cattapan, 2017–2020
- Barbara Bolt, 2020–2021
- Emma Redding, 2022–present
