= Society for Artistic Research =

The Society for Artistic Research (SAR) is an international nonprofit, artistic and scientific society devoted to developing, linking and disseminating internationally artistic research as a specific practice of producing knowledge. SAR also aims to facilitate co-operation and communication among those interested in the study and practices of artistic research.

== History ==
SAR was founded in 2010 in Bern, Switzerland (as an initiative of the two artists Florian Dombois and Michael Schwab together with Henk Borgdorff) by about 80 artists, researchers and academics from around the globe. It is the only international society for artistic research in the world. It has an international membership drawn from both academic and non-academic institutions and individuals.

== Objectives ==
- to promote the practices of artistic research done in and outside of academic institutions
- to facilitate co-operation and communication among those interested in artistic research
- to hold, or to participate in the holding of, conferences and meetings for the communication of artistic based knowledge, and to publicise and disseminate by other means knowledge and views concerning artistic research practices and results

== Activities ==
- The society publishes the triannual Journal for Artistic Research (JAR), an international, online, open access and peer-reviewed journal for the identification, publication and dissemination of artistic research and its methodologies, from all arts disciplines.
- The society publishes the Research Catalogue (RC), a searchable, documentary database of artistic research, to which anyone can contribute.
- The society awards the Annual Prize for Excellent Research Catalogue Exposition for innovative, experimental new formats of publications.
- The society hosts an annual convention consisting of a conference covering various specialist topics organised around a theme.

== Current executive board (elected till) ==
- Florian Schneider, President (Trondheim, Norway; 2026)
- Geir Strøm, Vice-President (Bergen, Norway; 2024 )
- Jaana Erkkilä-Hill, Vice-President (Helsinki, Finland; 2024)
- Angela Bartram (Derby, UK; 2024)
- Michaela Glanz (Vienna, Austria; 2024)
- Blanka Chládková,(Brno, The Czech Republic; 2026)
- Esa Kirkkopelto (Helsinki, Finland; 2026)
- Johan A. Haarberg, Executive Officer (Bergen, Norway)
- Jessica Kaiser, SAR Executive Consultant (Gras, Austria; 2022)

Board 2020-2022: Deniz Peters, President / Geir Strøm, Vice-President (Bergen, Norway; since 2018) / Jaana Erkkilä-Hill, Vice-President (Helsinki, Finland; since 2020), Angela Bartram (Derby, UK; since 2018) / Chrysa Parkinson (Stockholm, Sweden; 2020-2021) / Gabriele Schmid (Ottersberg, Germany; 2015-2022); Johan A. Haarberg, SAR Executive Officer (Bergen, Norway) / Jessica Kaiser, SAR Executive Consultant (Gras, Austria; 2022)

Board 2019-2020: Deniz Peters, President / Geir Strøm, Vice-President (Bergen, Norway; since 2018) / Giaco Schiesser, Vice-President (Zurich, Switzerland; since 2013) / Angela Bartram (Derby, UK) / Alexander Damianisch (Wien, Österreich; since 2013) / Leena Rouhiainen, Helsinki, Finland; since 2015) / Gabriele Schmid (Ottersberg, Germany); Johan A. Haarberg, SAR Executive Officer (Bergen, Norway)

Board 2017-2019: Henk Borgdorff, President (Leiden / The Hague, Netherlands) / Geir Strøm, Vice-President (Bergen, Norway; since 2018) / Giaco Schiesser, Vice-President (Zurich, Switzerland) / Angela Bartram (Derby, UK) / Alexander Damianisch (Wien, Österreich) / Leena Rouhiainen, Helsinki, Finland) / Gabriele Schmid (Ottersberg, Germany); Johan A. Haarberg, SAR Executive Officer (Bergen, Norway; since 2018)

Board 2015-2017: Henk Borgdorff, President (Leiden / The Hague, Netherlands) / Johan A. Haarberg, Vice-President (Bergen, Norway) / Giaco Schiesser, Vice-President (Zurich, Switzerland) / Alexander Damianisch (Wien, Österreich) / Anya Lewin (Plymouth, UK) / Leena Rouhiainen, Helsinki, Finland) / Gabriele Schmid (Ottersberg, Germany)

Board 2013-2015: Gerhard Eckel, President (Graz, Austria) / Johan A. Haarberg, Vice-President (Bergen, Norway) / Rolf Hughes, Vice-President (Stockholm, Sweden) / Alexander Damianisch (Wien, Österreich) / Julie Harboe (Lucerne, Switzerland) / Efva Lilja (Stockholm, Sweden) / Giaco Schiesser (Zurich, Switzerland)

Board 2011-2013: Anna Lindal, President (Gothenburg, Sweden) / Florian Dombois, Vice-President (Bern, Switzerland) / Rolf Hughes, Vice-President (Stockholm, Sweden) / Barbara Bolt (Melbourne, Australia) / Gerhard Eckel (Graz, Austria) / Kim Gorus (Antwerp, Belgium) / Johan A. Haarberg (Bergen, Norway)

Board 2010-2011: Florian Dombois, President (Bern, Switzerland) / Anna Lindal, Vice-President (Gothenburg, Sweden) / Darla Crispin, Vice-President (Ghent, Belgium) / Jan Kaila (Helsinki, Finland) / Sofie van Loo (Antwerp, Belgium) / George Petelin (Brisbane, Australia) / Stephen Scrivener (London, Great Britain)
