= Faculty of Fine Arts and Music, University of Melbourne =

Faculty of the University of Melbourne

Faculty of Fine Arts & Music
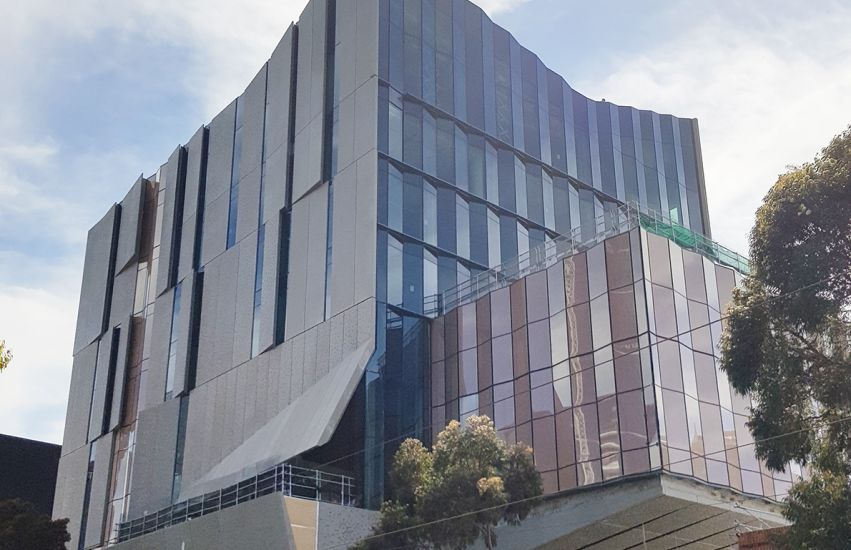
- Other names: Faculty of VCA & MCM, FFAM
- Type: Public
- Established: 2009; 17 years ago
- Dean: Marie Sierra
- Director: Richard Kurth, Barbara Bolt
- Academic staff: 186
- Students: 7,000
- Location: Southbank, Victoria, Australia; 37.8248°S 144.9702°E
- Campus: Urban (Southbank Campus) 4 Hectares
- Website: finearts-music.unimelb.edu.au

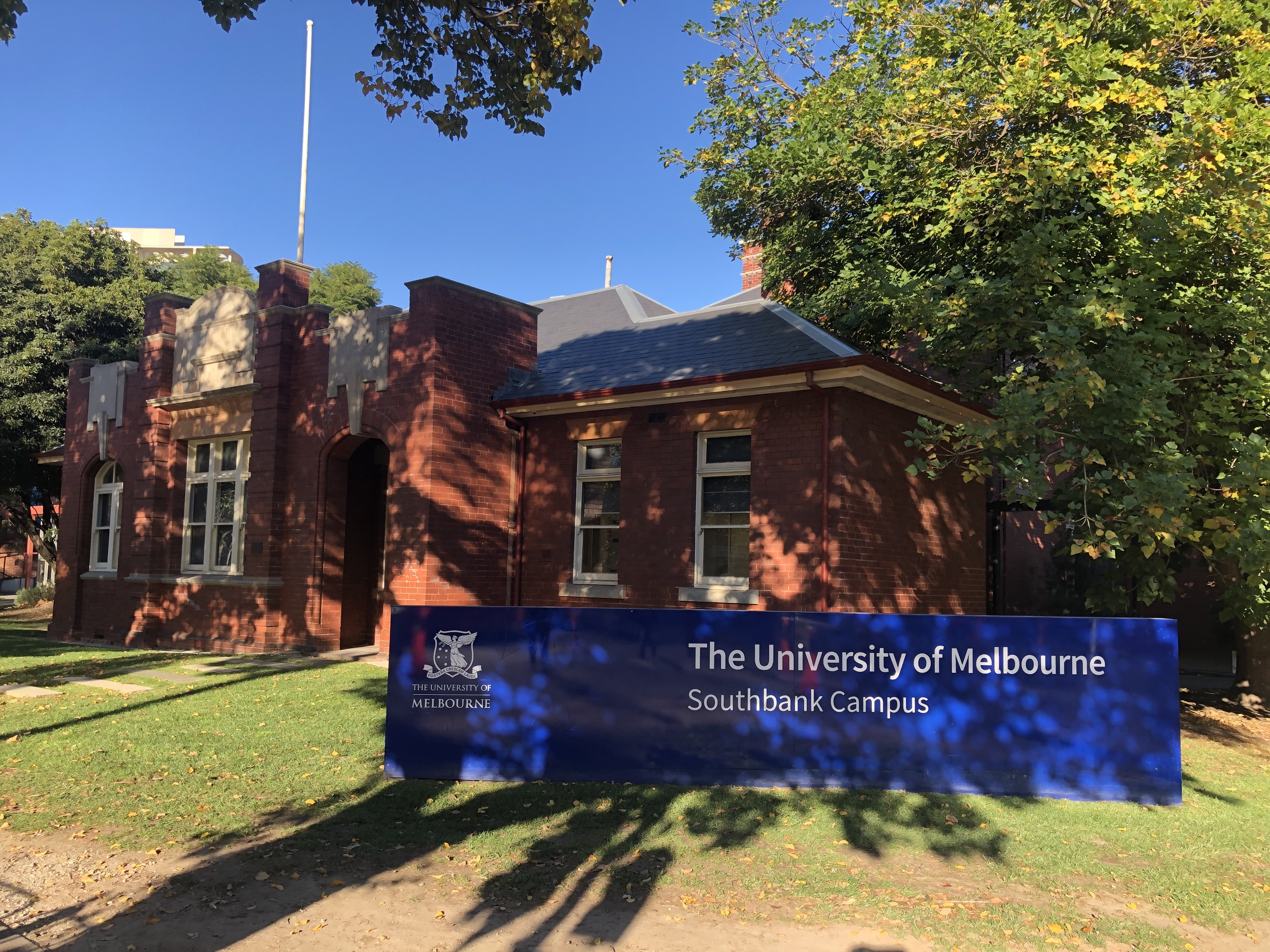
Entrance of Southbank Campus

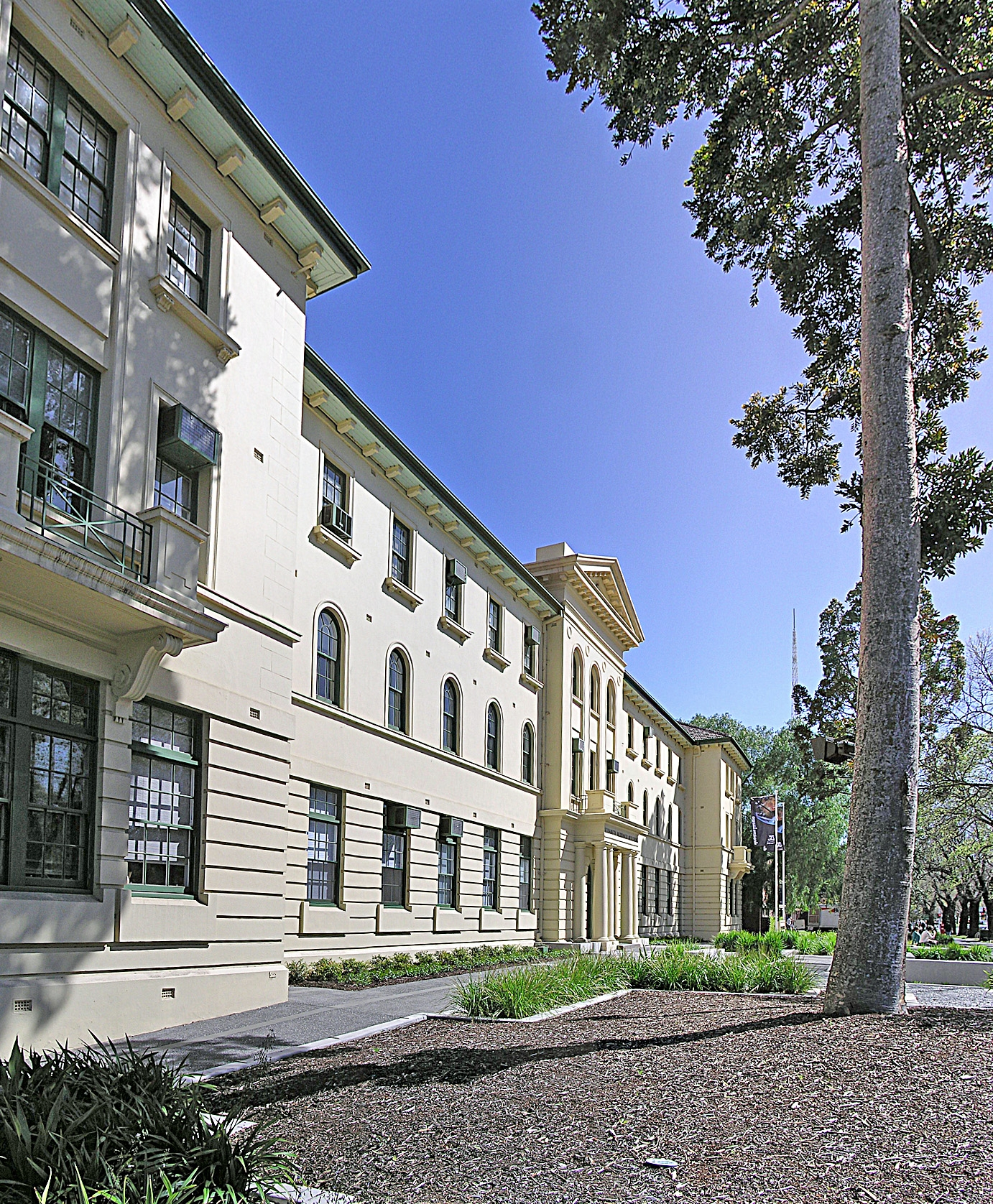
The Elisabeth Murdoch Building looking towards Melbourne Arts Centre spire on St. Kilda Road

The Faculty of Fine Arts and Music (formerly known as the Faculty of the Victorian College of the Arts and Melbourne Conservatorium of Music) is a faculty of the University of Melbourne, in Victoria, Australia. It is located near the Melbourne City Centre, with its main campus at Southbank on St Kilda Road, housing the Victorian College of the Arts (VCA) and the Melbourne Conservatorium of Music (The Conservatorium). Part of Music also operates from the Parkville campus of the University of Melbourne.

== History ==
The Faculty was created in 2009 from the amalgamation of the university's Faculty of Music (founded as the University Conservatorium in 1895) and Faculty of the Victorian College of the Arts. Founded in 1972, the VCA integrated into the University of Melbourne in 2007 as a separate faculty. Due to dissatisfaction – particularly from students of the old VCA – with the structural changes imposed by the university, in November 2009 former Telstra CEO Ziggy Switkowski was appointed to chair a review. A number of his recommendations were adopted, resulting in the resignation of the inaugural dean, abandonment of the previous push for full amalgamation, the creation of a divisional structure with a more centralised administration and two relatively distinct teaching entities at the Parkville and Southbank campuses, and a change in the title of the head of the two divisions to Director. The appointment of a new Dean under this new structure, occurred in 2011.

This was not the first time, however, that sharing of resources across two institutions had been attempted. In 1974, at the time of the establishment of the VCA School of Music, the original entity called the University Conservatorium was finally unincorporated. Symbolically as well as in practice, the central place of instrumental tuition at the Faculty was removed to the new VCA and replaced with a more academic syllabus. Between 1975 and 1981, the teaching of most woodwind, some brass, double bass and guitar was undertaken by VCA staff at the Southbank campus.

Although much work has been done to ensure the autonomy of the VCA, the economic climate of the late 1980s led to a full amalgamation of the VCA and the Faculty of Music that took effect on 1 July 1991. The new organisation was known as the Faculty of Music, Visual and Performing Arts. John Poynter was appointed as dean of the new super faculty. In September, Warren Bebbington was appointed to the vacant Ormond Chair and, at the urging of staff on both sides, worked to reverse the amalgamation, which was effected in 1994.

On 1 January 2012 the Faculty's name was changed to reflect the two operating divisions and was known as the Faculty of the Victorian College of the Arts and Melbourne Conservatorium of Music (Faculty of the VCA and MCM).

On 1 January 2018, the Faculty's name was changed again to the Faculty of Fine Arts and Music. The Victorian College of the Arts and Melbourne Conservatorium remain as schools within the Faculty.

=== Deans ===
- Peter Oyston, 1976-1984
- Andrea Hull, 1995-2009
- Sharman Pretty, 2009–2010
- Warren Bebbington, 2010 (acting)
- Barry Conyngham, 2011–2021
- Marie Sierra, 2021–present

== Melbourne Conservatorium of Music ==
=== Relocation of Melbourne Conservatorium ===
In early 2019 the Melbourne Conservatorium of Music relocated from University of Melbourne's Parkville campus, to its Southbank campus. This was due to the worsening condition and lack of space of the original facilities it had been using since it was founded in 1894. Moving to the Southbank campus allows it to be alongside the Victorian College of the Arts in Melbourne's Art Precinct, however, has led to a greater distancing from Arts and Humanities facilities at Parkville.

The relocation and build cost $104.5 million which included the construction of a new 400-plus-seat auditorium as well as a public square, Linear Park. The move was also part of a larger initiative by the Victorian Government (who also contributed funding towards the project) to completely renovate the Southbank Arts Precinct.

=== Discipline areas within the Melbourne Conservatorium of Music ===
- Composition
- Early Music
- Ethnomusicology
- Interactive Composition
- Jazz and Improvisation
- Music Performance
- Music Psychology
- Musicology
- Music Therapy
- New Music
- Performance Teaching

== See also ==
- Victorian College of the Arts Centre for Ideas
- Australian art
