= Giaco Schiesser =

- Born: 1953 (age 72–73)
- Known for: cultural studies

Giaco Schiesser (born 1953) is a Zurich-based theorist of cultural and media studies. He is a professor emeritus for cultural theory and media theory and for artistic research of Zurich University of the Arts, ZHdK (Switzerland).

== Biography ==
Giaco Schiesser was born in Glarus (Switzerland). He studied philosophy, cultural studies and German literature studies at Free University in Berlin (Germany). Afterwards he became an associate lecturer at Free University and assistant lecturer at the Institute for German Literature, University of Basle (Switzerland).

From the mid-1980s to the mid-1990s he mainly worked as a publicist and a scientific editor: For ten years he was co-publisher of the scientific-political-cultural journal Widerspruch, for five years in charge of the department Science & Humanities of the weekly WOZ Die Wochenzeitung, both published in Zurich. At the same time he was an associate researcher at the Hamburg-based Institute for Research of Migration and Racism (Institut Migrations- und Rassismusforschung) with a research focus on contemporary constitutions of the subject.

From the mid-1990s till 2021 he worked at Zurich University of the Arts. First, as a lecturer of the theory and history of visual communication, then he conceptualized and realized the establishment of the department New Media (since 2017: BA Art & Media / Digital Practices) at the University of Art and Design Zurich as head of that department, which he directed from 1999 to 2002 (together with artistic media group Knowbotic Research and media artist Margarete Jahrmann. Since then the focus of his work has been centering on the far-reaching economical, political and cultural impact of the digitalisation of today's post-Fordist society and on the conception of the Eigensinn of media, an attempt to analyze more precisely the «mediality of media» and its impact and effects.

Since the beginning of the 2000s he served as a professor for the theories and media in the MFA programme (2002–2018) and as head of Department of Media & Art/HGKZ and of Department of Art & Media/ZHdK (2002–2017). In these capacities he assumed responsibility for the conception and realisation of novel artistic curricula–a New Media programme, novel BA and MA Fine Arts curricula–and, within the most recent years for the conception of novel artistic (practice based) Ph.D. programmes and the problematics of Artistic Research as well as to the problematics of authorship, of psychoanalysis and of Bob Dylan as DJ.

In December 2019 he was honoured with the award «Top 100 Leaders in Education». The purpose of the award (2019 was its first-time edition), awarded by the “Global Forum for Education & Learning (GFEL) is «to honor the relentless efforts and zeal of individuals, who have played a prominent role in changing the face of education at the global as well as the local level.”

In addition, since 2009 he holds a permanent visiting professorship for artistic and scientific Ph.D. at University of Art and Design Linz (Austria). In this capacity he conceptualized and founded the first PhD-programme in Artistic Research at Zurich University of the Arts, run as a joint PhD-programme by Zurich University of the Arts and University of Arts and Design Linz (Austria), which he has been heading from 2012 to 2020 (since 2017 together with Florian Dombois). From 2009 to its closing down in 2017 by ETH Zurich he also was a member of the board of interdisciplinary Cortona-Week, organized by ETH Zurich and ZHdK, from 2013 to 2020 a member (from 2015 to 2020: vice-president) of the Executive Board of the international Society for Artistic Research (SAR). Since 2013 he has been a member of the advisory council of Entresol, a network for the sciences of psyche (Zurich).

Member of the board of directors of Kurhaus Bergün AG, Switzerland (since 2005).

His work and his publications focus on theories of cultures, of media and of subjects / epistemology / aesthetics, art research / democracy, public spheres, every day culture.

== Publications ==
Author (Selection)

- Art Education without Condition in Times of Neo-Feudalism and of a New Nihilism. (Chinese Translation, primary publication) In: New Arts, Journal of the National Academy of Art / China Art Academy, Hangzhou, V. 39, Number 5/2018.
- The Florence Principles on the Doctorate in the Arts. A Publication by ELIA (European League of the Institutes of the Arts). Amsterdam 2016. (Co-Author)
- Der Soundtrack des Lebens. Bob Dylans Theme Time Radio Hour und das Unheimliche Amerikas. In: Serialität. Wissenschaften, Künste, Medien. Hrsg. von Olaf Knellessen, Giaco Schiesser, Daniel Strassberg. Wien: Turia + Kant 2015, ISBN 978-3-85132-766-3
- Dritter Zyklus. In: Künstlerische Forschung. Ein Handbuch. Ed. Jens Badura et al. Zürich: Diaphanes 2015, ISBN 978-3-03734-880-2
- What is at stake – Qu’est ce que l’enjeu? Paradoxes – Problematics – Perspectives in Artistic Research Today. In: Arts, Research, Innovation and Society. Eds. Gerald Bast, Elias G. Carayannis [= ARIS, Vol. 1]. Cham/New York et al.: Springer 2015, ISBN 978-3319099088
- Die unbedingte Psychoanalyse. Marginalien eines Nicht-Analytikers. In: Brigitte Boothe, Peter Schneider (Eds.): Die Psychoanalyse und ihre Bildung. Zurich: Sphères 2013, ISBN 978-3-905933-04-8
- «A Certain Frustration . . .» - Paradoxes, Voids, Perspectives of Artistic Research Today. In: Practices of Experimentation. Zurich: Scheidegger & Spiess / Chicago: University Press 2012, ISBN 978-3-85881-259-9
- Media / Art / Education. Eigensinn as an Artistic Productive Force. In: New Archeology 2009. Ed. Li Zhenhua. Shanghai: Look Print 2009 (also in German and Chinese)
- Media Authorship. In: Visual Arts. Indian and Swiss Authors on Media Art and Theory. [= The India Habitat' Centre's Art Journal, Vol. 9]. New Delhi: Habitat Centre 2009
- Autorschaft nach dem Tod des Authors. Barthes und Foucault revisited. In: Autorschaft in den Künsten. Konzepte – Praktiken – Medien. Ed. Hans Peter Schwarz. Zurich: Museum für Gestaltung 2007
- Working on and with Eigensinn. A neglected concept and its impact on Media, Art and Art Education. In: Interface Cultures. Eds. Christa Sommerer, Laurent Mignonneau und Dorothée Gestrich. Bielefeld: transcript 2008, ISBN 978-3-89942-884-1
- Art School without Condition: Art Education in Postindustrial Society. Notes on a Neglected Discussion. In: ZHdK. A Future for the Arts. Zurich University of the Arts Inaugural Publication. Ed. Hans-Peter Schwarz. Zurich: Scheidegger & Spiess / Chicago: University Press 2007, ISBN 978-3-85881-709-9
- Das sich selbst fesselnde Subjekt – Lust auf Leben. In: Subjekte, Stars und Chips. Subjektpositionen in den Künsten. Ed. Marion Strunk. Zurich: Edition Howeg 1999
- Das Paradies liegt westwärts! 9 Thesen zur Version 8.0 der besten aller Welten. In: Multi Media Mania. Reflexionen zu Aspekten der Neuen Medien. Ed. René Pfammatter. Konstanz: UVK 1998
- Arbeitswelt, Demokratie, Staat – einige Problemfelder im politischen und sozialen Umfeld elektronischer Märkte. In: G. Schiesser et al.: Electronic Markets: Importance and Meaning for Switzerland. Bern: Swiss Science and Technology Council (SSTC), 1996
- Lust auf Leben, gefesselt. Der ganz alltägliche Rassismus als blinder Fleck des Antirassismus. In: Fremd im Paradies. Migration und Rassismus. Ed. Udo Rauchfleisch. Basel: Lenoss 1994, ISBN 978-3-85787-234-1.

Editor (Selection)

- Kurhaus Bergün. Der Traum vom Grand Hotel. Hier und Jetzt, Baden/Zürich 2021, ^{2}2022 ISBN 978-3-03919-526-8
- Serialität. Wissenschaften, Künste, Medien. Eds. Olaf Knellessen, Giaco Schiesser, Daniel Strassberg. Wien: Turia + Kant 2015, ISBN 978-3-85132-766-3
- General Editor Fast Series, Department Art & Media / Zurich University of the Arts, vol. 1/2013, ISBN 978-3-85881-409-8
- General Editor Series Yearbook Department Art & Media / Zurich University of the Arts, 4 vols. Zurich 2006-2012, ISBN 3-905701-84-7, ISBN 978-3-85881-187-5, ISBN 978-3-85881-210-0, ISBN 978-3-85881-259-9
- Practices of Experimentation. Research and Teaching in the Arts Today. Zurich: Scheidegger & Spiess / Chicago: University Press 2012 (Co-editor), ISBN 978-3-85881-259-9
- Metaworx – Approaches to Interactivity. Basel/Boston/Berlin: Birkhäuser 2003 (Co-editor), ISBN 978-3764300890
- Otto F. Walter: Gegenwort. Aufsätze, Reden, Begegnungen. Herausgegeben, mit einer Nachbemerkung und einer Bibliographie versehen von Giaco Schiesser. Zurich: Limmat 1988
- Widerspruch. Half-year journal. Zurich 1983–1993 (Co-editor)
