= Live performance =

Live performance may refer to:

- A play (theatre) or musical
- A concert, a live performance (typically of music) before an audience
- A concert performance of opera or musical theatre without theatrical staging
- A concert dance, performed live for an audience.
- Live broadcast, a live performance transmitted via various types of broadcast media
  - Live radio, radio broadcast without delay
  - Live television, a television production broadcast in real-time, as events happen, in the present
- Live Performance, a 1971 live album by Jake Thackray

== See also ==
- Musical performance (disambiguation)
- Performance
