= Florian Dombois =

German artist and geophysicist

Florian Dombois (born 1966 in Berlin) is an artist who focuses on time, landforms, labilities, seismic and tectonic activity, as well as on their various representational and media formats.

Dombois studied geophysics and philosophy in Berlin, Kiel and Hawaii, and wrote his PhD in Amsterdam and Berlin. After that, he has developed a concept of "Art as Research" to challenge modernism in art and scientific modes of expression. His oeuvre includes spatial and sound installations, but also happenings and performances. In 2003–2011, he was heading the Institute for Transdisciplinarity (Y), and was president of the research council at Berne University of the Arts. Since 2011, he is professor at Zurich University of the Arts. In 2010, he received the German Sound Art Prize.

== Exhibitions (selection) ==
- 2015 „Inverse“ City of Dresden (group)
- 2014 „Struck Modernism“ Museum Haus Konstruktiv Zurich (solo)
- 2014 „Allegory of the Cave Painting“ Extra City Kunsthal Antwerp (group)
- 2013 „uboc No.1 & stuVi2“ at Boston University Campus (solo)
- 2012 „Päparat Bergsturz“ Kunstmuseum Chur (group)
- 2011 „ArtBoom Festival“ Kraków (group)
- 2010 „Deutscher Klangkunst-Preis 2010“ Skulpturenmuseum Glaskasten Marl (group)
- 2009 „Off the Record“ Galerie gelbe MUSIK Berlin (solo)
- 2009 „A Fantasy for Allan Kaprow“ Contemporary Image Collective - CIC, Kairo (group)
- 2008 „The perfect performance is… - A Reply to James Lee Byars, 1978“ Kunstmuseum Bern (CH) (Performance)
- 2008 „Essential Landscape“ Galerie Bernhard Bischoff (CH) (dual)
- 2008 „Spectropia“ RIXC / Riga Art Space (LV) (group)
- 2008 „Art as Research“ Peer-reviewed Exhibition in der Villa Elisabeth, Berlin (group)
- 2007 „What are the places of danger?“ Imprimerie Basel, Schweiz (solo)
- 2006 „Pre-Emptive“ Kunsthalle Bern (CH) (group)
- 2006 „Brekzien“ Galerie Rachel Haferkamp, Köln (solo)
- 2004 „Klangraum-Raumklang“ KHM, Köln (group)
- 2003 „terra antwort“ Galerie Rachel Haferkamp, Köln (solo)

== Books (selection) ==
- Museum Haus Konstruktiv (ed.): „Florian Dombois: Angeschlagene Moderne / Struck Modernism“ (Exh.cat.) Berlin: The Green Box, 2014
- Josef Felix Müller (ed.): „Florian Dombois: Zugabe“ St. Gallen / Berlin: Vexer, 2014
- Florian Dombois, Ute Meta Bauer, Claudia Mareis and Michael Schwab (eds.): „Intellectual Birdhouse. Artistic Practice as Research“ London: Koenig, 2012
- Kunsthalle Bern (ed.): „Florian Dombois: What Are the Places of Danger. Works 1999-2009“ Berlin: argobooks, 2010
- Florian Dombois, Guy Krneta (eds.): „Nah am Original. Fünf Autoren antworten auf Albert Einstein 2005“ Basel: Engeler Editor, 2007
- Florian Dombois: „Seismic Stations“ Cologne: Buchhandlung Walther König, 2002
