= Barbara Bolt =

Australian academic and artist

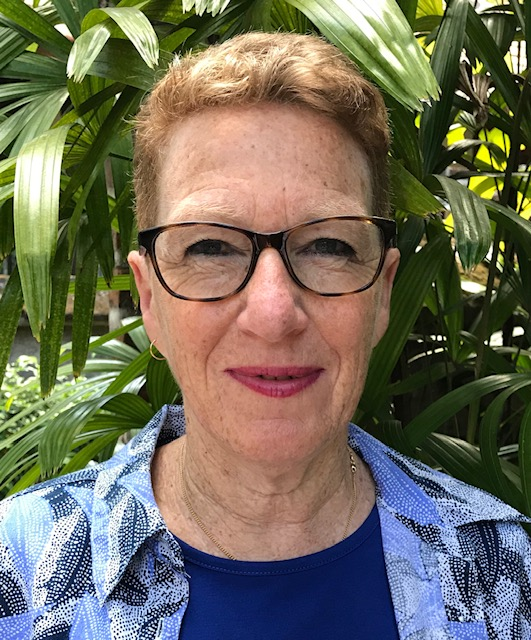

Academic work
- Discipline: art history art theory
- Institutions: Victorian College of the Arts

Barbara Bolt is an Australian academic and artist. She is the current director of the Victorian College of the Arts which is part of the Faculty of Fine Arts and Music at the University of Melbourne. She is a research theorist; her research investigates art theory and criticism (performativity, research ethics, new materialism), and art as research (practice-led research). Her art practice investigates the material possibilities of painting in a digital age and the relationship between painting and light (urban landscapes, colourfield, digital, neon). She was on the executive board of the international Society for Artistic Research (SAR), which produces the Journal of Artistic Research (JAR) and is a member of the editorial board of Australian Art Education.

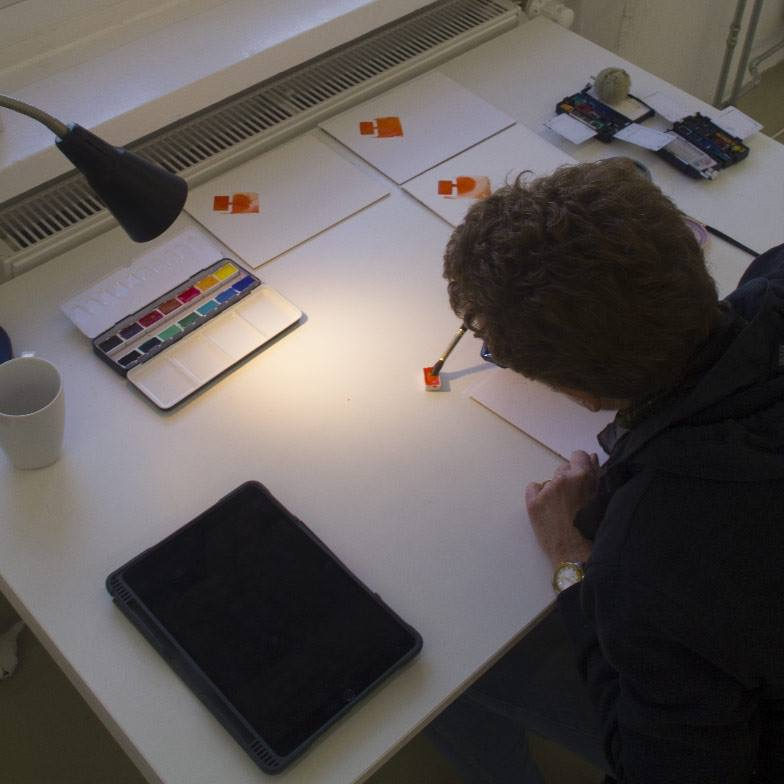
Bolt

== Publications ==
- Bolt, Barbara, 'Couch Grass: Ethics of the Rhizome', in: Cecilia Åsberg and Rosi Braidotti (eds.), A Feminist Companion to the Posthumanities. Springer. 2018, pp. 67-80
- Bolt, Barbara, 'Socially Engaged Art as a Boundary Rider', in: James Oliver (ed.), Associations : creative practice and research. Melbourne University Press. 2018
- Barrett, Estelle, and Barbara Bolt, eds. Material inventions: applying creative arts research. IB Tauris, 2014
- Barrett, Estelle, and Barbara Bolt, eds. Carnal knowledge: towards a'new materialism'through the arts. IB Tauris, 2013
- Barrett, Estelle, and Barbara Bolt, eds. Practice as research: Approaches to creative arts enquiry. IB Tauris, 2014
- Bolt, Barbara, Heidegger reframed: Interpreting key thinkers for the arts. IB Tauris, 2010
- Bolt, Barbara, 'The Techno-Sublime: Towards a Post-aesthetic', in: Barbara Bolt (ed.), "Sensorium: Aesthetics, Art, Life". Cambridge Scholars Press, 2007, pp. 43-51
- Bolt, Barbara, "Material thinking and the agency of matter." Studies in material thinking 1, no. 1 (2007): 1-4
- Bolt, Barbara, Art Beyond Representation: The Performative Power of the Image. London: IB Tauris, 2004
