= Darla Crispin =

Canadian pianist, scholar, lecturer, and academic leader

Darla Crispin (born 12 March 1964) is a Canadian pianist, scholar, lecturer and academic leader. She was the Director of Arne Nordheim Centre for Artistic Research (NordART) and Vice Rector for Research and Artistic Development at the Norwegian Academy of Music in Oslo.

== Early life and education ==
Crispin was born in British Columbia, Canada, and took her BMus at the University of Victoria. She later moved to the United Kingdom, and had her Concert Recital Diploma from the Guildhall School of Music & Drama, London, and an MMus and PhD in Historical Musicology from King’s College, London.

== Career ==
She worked for several years with contemporary music ensembles in The Netherlands, before she shifted her focus towards teaching and scholarship. She was responsible for developing postgraduate programmes at the Guildhall School and, later, at the Royal College of Music, where she established, and was the first Head of the RCM Graduate School, being granted the title of HonRCM in 2009.

In 2008–2013 Crispin worked as a Research Fellow at the Orpheus Research Centre in Music (ORCiM). Her areas of expertise are artistic research and musical modernity and historical musicology, especially the music of the Second Viennese School. Several of her recent works examine the Second Viennese School repertoire through methods of artistic research in music.

She is recognized for her work in the field of artistic research, currently as an advisor for the Norwegian Artistic Research Programme, and on the International Advisory Board of PARSE (Gothenburg, Sweden). She has published many articles and conference papers, and has given invited presentations at several international events on artistic research, its development in higher music institutions and its relevance to her own work.
