= Musical performance =

Musical performance may refer to:

- Auditioning, a sampling of a performance
- Concert, the performance of multiple pieces by an ensemble or soloist.
  - Recital, a performance which highlights a single performer, composer, or instrument.
  - Concerto A musical composition emphasizing the interpretation by performers, distinct from improvisation or composition, often featuring a soloist with orchestral accompaniment.
- Musical composition, the creation of a music
  - Musical improvisation, as opposed to musical composition.
- Musical technique
  - Musical phrasing
- Network musical performance, a real-time interaction over a computer network that enables musicians in different locations to perform together.
- Street performance or busking.

== See also ==
- Piano history and musical performance
- Performance
- Music
- Performance art
